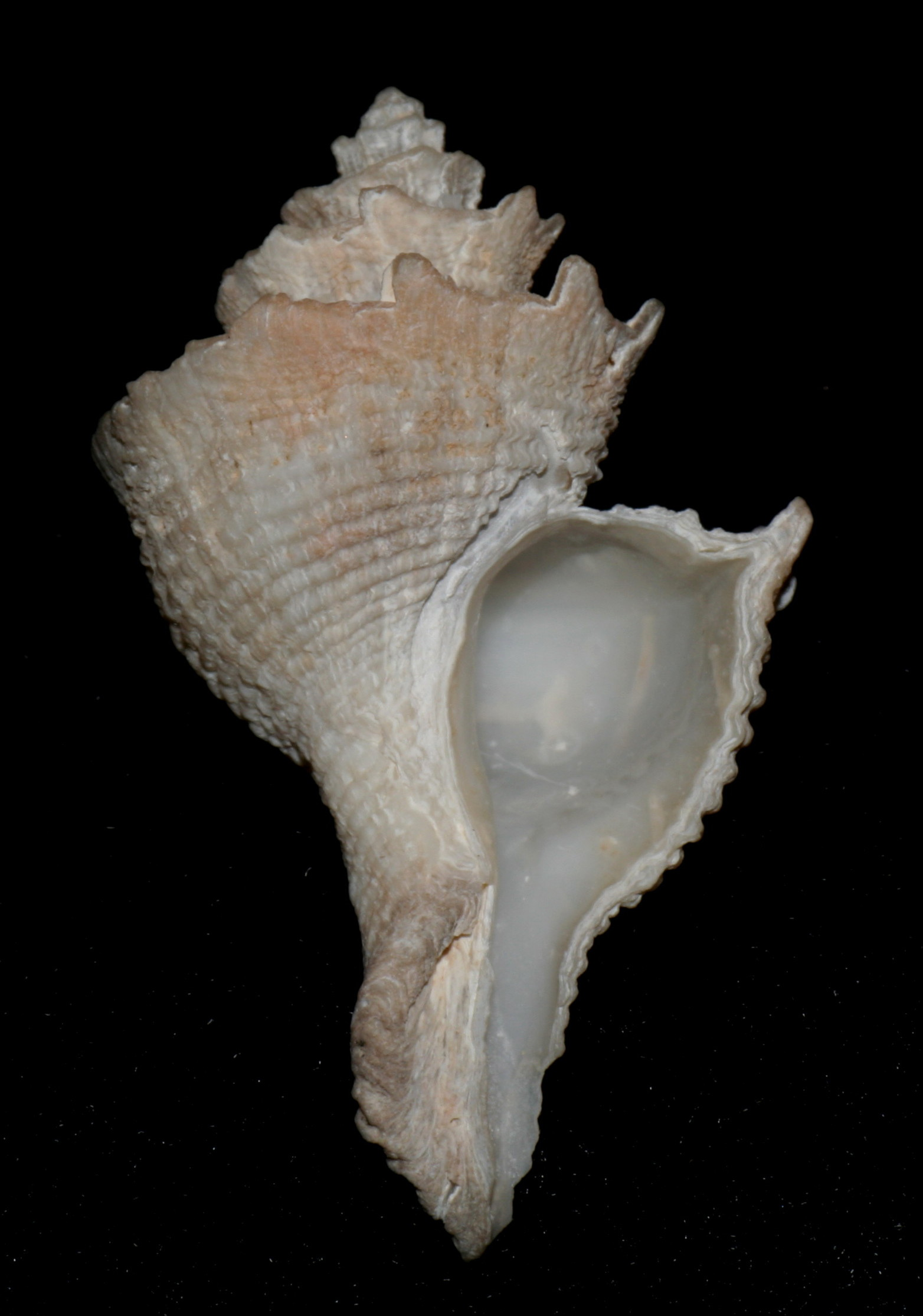
- A shell of Babelomurex kawamurai (Kira, 1959), 38.9 mm in length, trawled at 450 m depth in the Mozambique Channel in Africa.

Scientific classification
- Kingdom: Animalia
- Phylum: Mollusca
- Class: Gastropoda
- Subclass: Caenogastropoda
- Order: Neogastropoda
- Family: Muricidae
- Genus: Babelomurex
- Species: B. kawamurai

Binomial name
- Babelomurex kawamurai (Kira, 1959)

Synonyms
- Latiaxis (Babelomurex) kawamurai Kira, 1959; Latiaxis kawamurai Kira, 1959

= Babelomurex kawamurai =

Species of gastropod

Babelomurex kawamurai is a species of sea snail, a marine gastropod mollusc in the family Muricidae, the murex snails or rock snails.

Subspecies Babelomurex kawamurai helenae (Azuma, 1973): synonym of Babelomurex helenae (Azuma, 1973)

== Distribution ==
This marine species occurs off Japan, the Philippines and Australia (Northern Territory).
