= Babelomurex miyokoae =

Scientific classification
- Kingdom: Animalia
- Phylum: Mollusca
- Class: Gastropoda
- Subclass: Caenogastropoda
- Order: Neogastropoda
- Superfamily: Muricoidea
- Family: Muricidae
- Subfamily: Coralliophilinae
- Genus: Babelomurex
- Species: B. miyokoae

Binomial name
- Babelomurex miyokoae Kosuge, 1985

Synonyms
- Babelomurex (Lamellatiaxis) miyokoae Kosuge, 1985 superseded combination; Coralliophila miyokoae (Kosuge, 1985)

Species of gastropod

Babelomurex miyokoae is a species of sea snail, a marine gastropod mollusk, in the family Muricidae, the murex snails or rock snails.

== Distribution ==
It is distributed near the Philippines and Japan.
