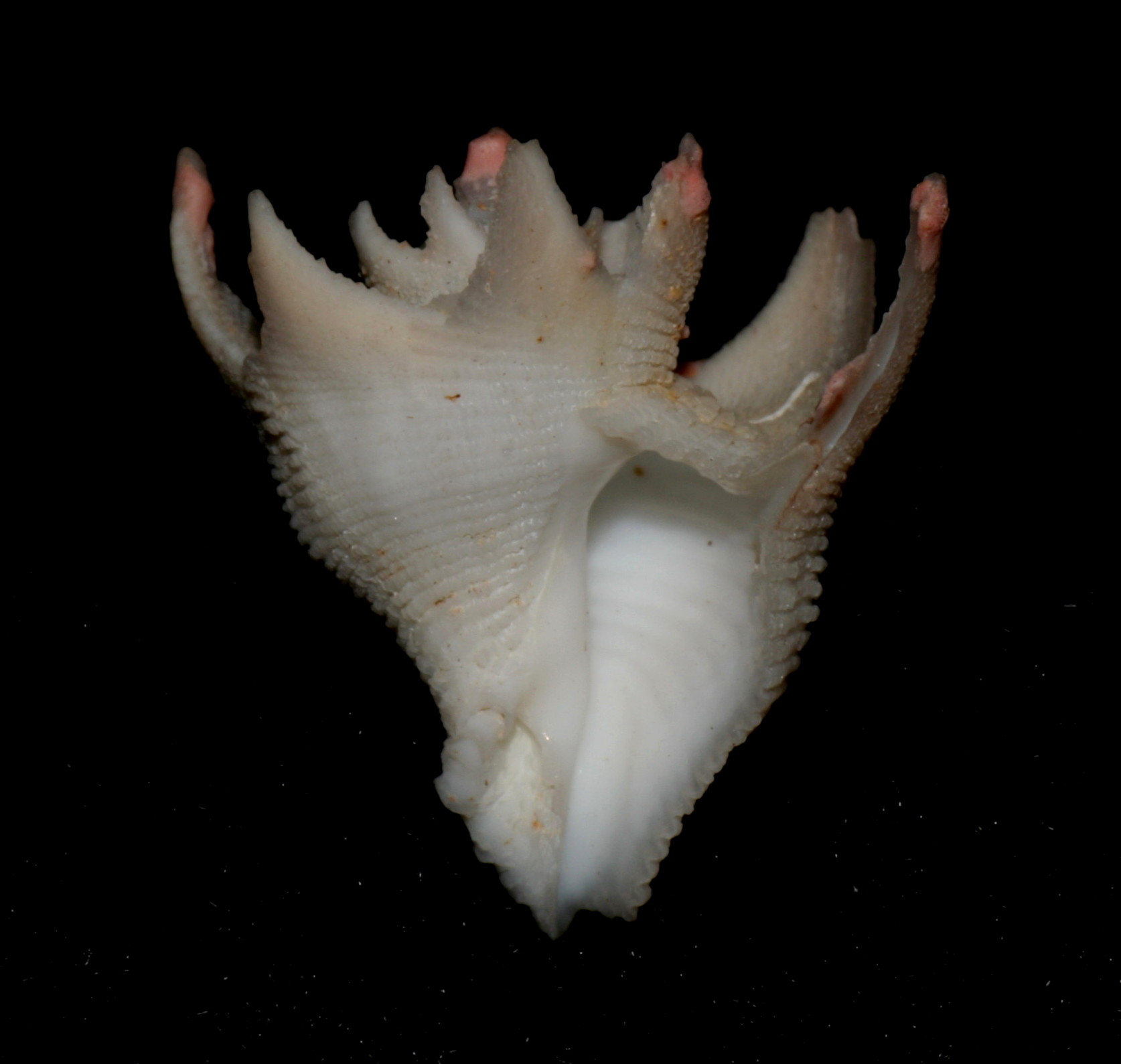
- A shell of Babelomurex finchii (H.C. Fulton, 1930), 22.6 mm in length, taken at 80 fathoms in tangle nets off Panglao, Bohol Island, in the Philippines.

Scientific classification
- Kingdom: Animalia
- Phylum: Mollusca
- Class: Gastropoda
- Subclass: Caenogastropoda
- Order: Neogastropoda
- Family: Muricidae
- Genus: Babelomurex
- Species: B. finchii

Binomial name
- Babelomurex finchii (Fulton, 1930)

Synonyms
- Latiaxis dunkeri Kuroda & T. Habe, 1961 junior subjective synonym; Latiaxis finchii Fulton, 1930

= Babelomurex finchii =

Species of gastropod

Babelomurex finchii, common name Finch's latiaxis, is a species of sea snail, a marine gastropod mollusc in the family Muricidae, the murex snails or rock snails.

== Description ==
The shell size varies between 20 mm and 50 mm.

== Distribution ==
This species is distributed in the Pacific Ocean along Japan, Taiwan and the Philippines.
