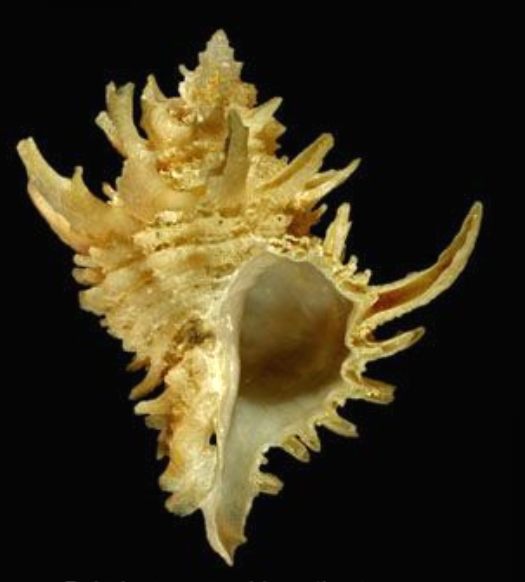
- Shell of Babelomurex problematicus (specimen at the Natural History Museum, Rotterdam)

Scientific classification
- Kingdom: Animalia
- Phylum: Mollusca
- Class: Gastropoda
- Subclass: Caenogastropoda
- Order: Neogastropoda
- Family: Muricidae
- Genus: Babelomurex
- Species: B. problematicus

Binomial name
- Babelomurex problematicus (Kosuge, 1980)

Synonyms
- Latiaxis (Echinolatiaxis) problematicus Kosuge, 1980 alternative representation; Latiaxis problematicus Kosuge, 1980 (original combination)

= Babelomurex problematicus =

Species of gastropod

Babelomurex problematicus is a species of sea snail, a marine gastropod mollusc in the family Muricidae, the murex snails or rock snails.

== Description ==
The length of the shell attains 21 mm.

== Distribution ==
This marine species occurs off the Philippines.
