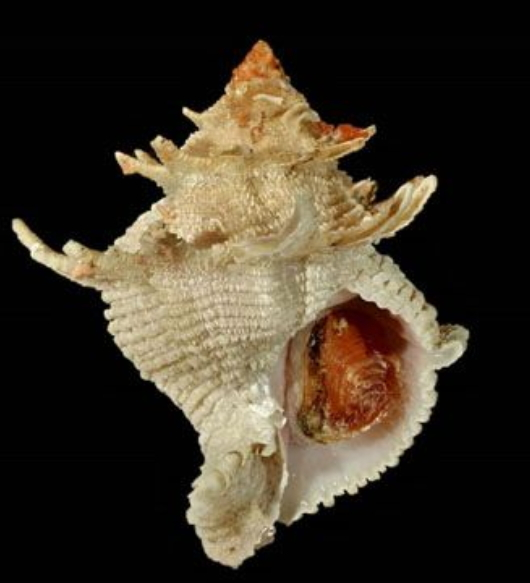
- Shell of Babelomurex cariniferoides(specimen at the Natural History Museum, Rotterdamà

Scientific classification
- Kingdom: Animalia
- Phylum: Mollusca
- Class: Gastropoda
- Subclass: Caenogastropoda
- Order: Neogastropoda
- Family: Muricidae
- Genus: Babelomurex
- Species: B. cariniferoides

Binomial name
- Babelomurex cariniferoides (Shikama, T., 1966)

Synonyms
- Latiaxis (Babelomurex) cariniferoides Shikama, 1966 superseded combination

= Babelomurex cariniferoides =

Species of gastropod

Babelomurex cariniferoides is a species of sea snail, a marine gastropod mollusc in the family Muricidae, the murex snails or rock snails.

== Description ==
The length of the shell attains 31 mm.

== Distribution ==
This marine species occurs off Japan and the Philippines.
