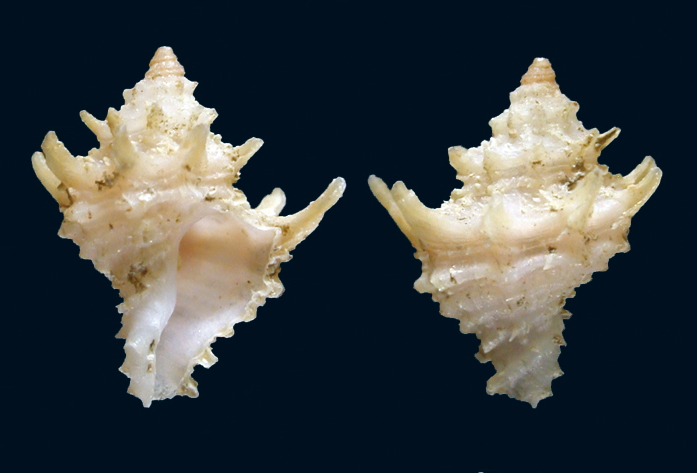
- Shell of Babelomurex colettae (paratype at the MNHN, Paris)

Scientific classification
- Kingdom: Animalia
- Phylum: Mollusca
- Class: Gastropoda
- Subclass: Caenogastropoda
- Order: Neogastropoda
- Family: Muricidae
- Genus: Babelomurex
- Species: B. colettae

Binomial name
- Babelomurex colettae Garrigues, D. Lamy & Zuccon, 2022

= Babelomurex colettae =

Species of gastropod

Babelomurex colettae is a species of sea snail, a marine gastropod mollusc in the family Muricidae, the murex snails or rock snails.

== Description ==
The length of the shell attains 6 mm.

== Distribution ==
This marine species occurs off Guadeloupe.
