= Babelomurex habui =

Scientific classification
- Kingdom: Animalia
- Phylum: Mollusca
- Class: Gastropoda
- Subclass: Caenogastropoda
- Order: Neogastropoda
- Superfamily: Muricoidea
- Family: Muricidae
- Subfamily: Coralliophilinae
- Genus: Babelomurex
- Species: B. habui

Binomial name
- Babelomurex habui (Azuma, 1971)

Synonyms
- Babelomurex (Lamellatiaxis) habui (Azuma, 1971) superseded combination; Latiaxis (Lamellatiaxis) habui Azuma, 1971

Species of gastropod

Babelomurex habui is a species of sea snail, a marine gastropod mollusk, in the family Muricidae, the murex snails or rock snails.

== Distribution ==
This marine species occurs off Japan and the Philippines.
