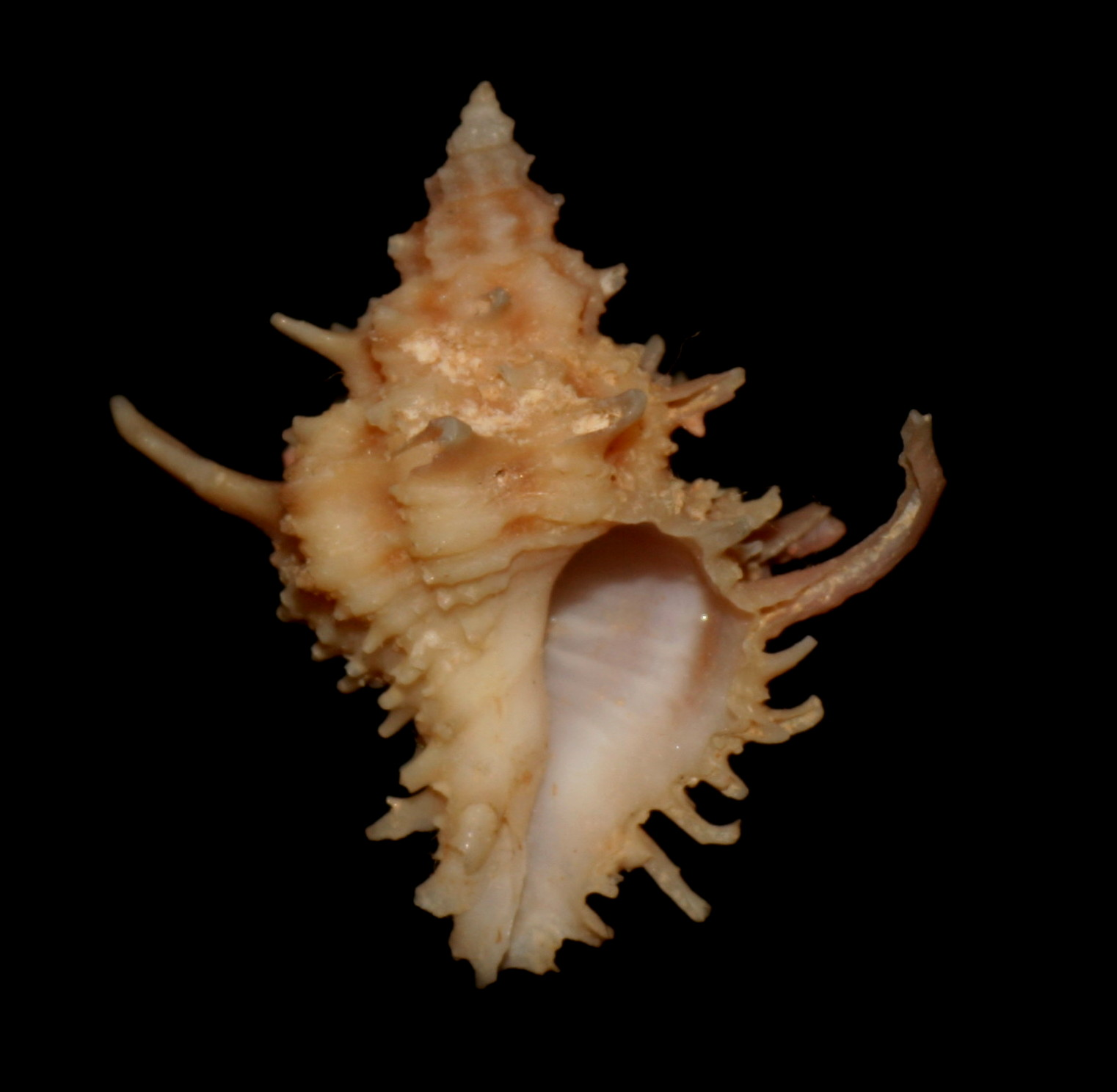
- Shell of Babelomurex yumimarumai Kosuge, 1985, measuring 18.3 mm in length, taken by tangle nets at 80 fathoms off Panglao, Bohol Island, in the Philippines

Scientific classification
- Kingdom: Animalia
- Phylum: Mollusca
- Class: Gastropoda
- Subclass: Caenogastropoda
- Order: Neogastropoda
- Family: Muricidae
- Genus: Babelomurex
- Species: B. yumimarumai

Binomial name
- Babelomurex yumimarumai Kosuge, 1985

= Babelomurex yumimarumai =

Species of gastropod

Babelomurex yumimarumai is a species of sea snail, a marine gastropod mollusc in the family Muricidae, the murex snails or rock snails.

== Distribution ==
This marine species occurs off the Philippines; off Vanuatu and off South Africa.
