= Babelomurex kuroharai =

Scientific classification
- Kingdom: Animalia
- Phylum: Mollusca
- Class: Gastropoda
- Subclass: Caenogastropoda
- Order: Neogastropoda
- Superfamily: Muricoidea
- Family: Muricidae
- Subfamily: Coralliophilinae
- Genus: Babelomurex
- Species: B. kuroharai

Binomial name
- Babelomurex kuroharai (Habe, 1970)

Synonyms
- Tarantellaxis kuroharai Habe, 1970

Species of gastropod

Babelomurex kuroharai is a species of sea snail, a marine gastropod mollusk, in the family Muricidae, the murex snails or rock snails.

== Distribution ==
This marine species occurs off Vanuatu.
