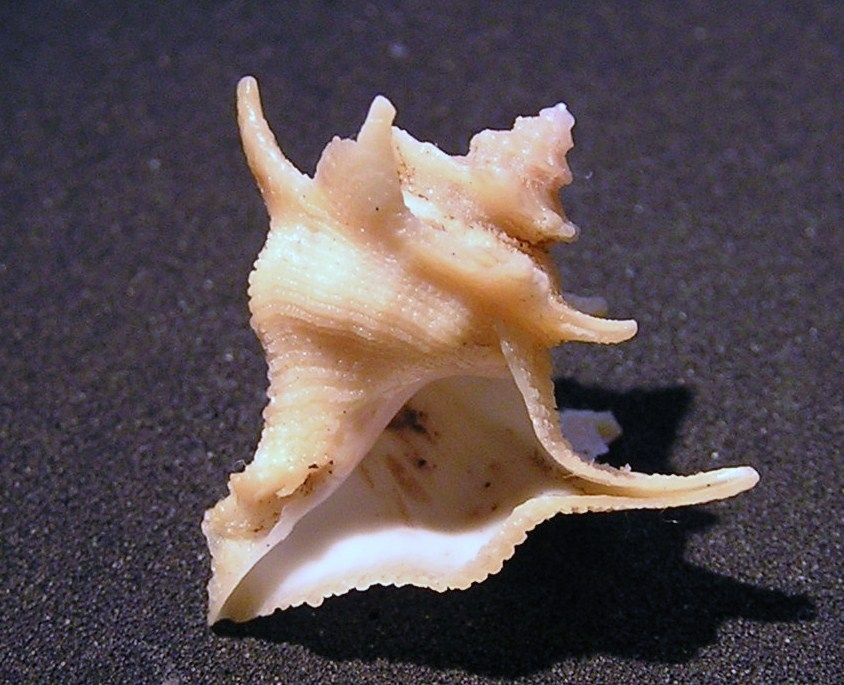
- Apertural view of a shell of Babelomurex hirasei

Scientific classification
- Kingdom: Animalia
- Phylum: Mollusca
- Class: Gastropoda
- Subclass: Caenogastropoda
- Order: Neogastropoda
- Family: Muricidae
- Genus: Babelomurex
- Species: B. hirasei

Binomial name
- Babelomurex hirasei Shikama, 1964

Synonyms
- Babelomurex (Babelomurex) hirasei (Shikama, T., 1964); Latiaxis (Babelomurex) hirasei Shikama, 1964 superseded combination

= Babelomurex hirasei =

Species of gastropod

Babelomurex hirasei is a species of sea snail, a marine gastropod mollusc in the family Muricidae, the murex snails or rock snails.

== Description ==
The shell varies between 18 mm and 50 mm in height and resembles a flower when looking at it from above. The shell also features long and developed spines that flare outward. The color of the shell is most commonly white, though specimens can appear in cream, yellow, or pink hues.

== Distribution ==
This marine species is found in the northern Indo-Pacific, but more specifically Japan and the Philippines.
