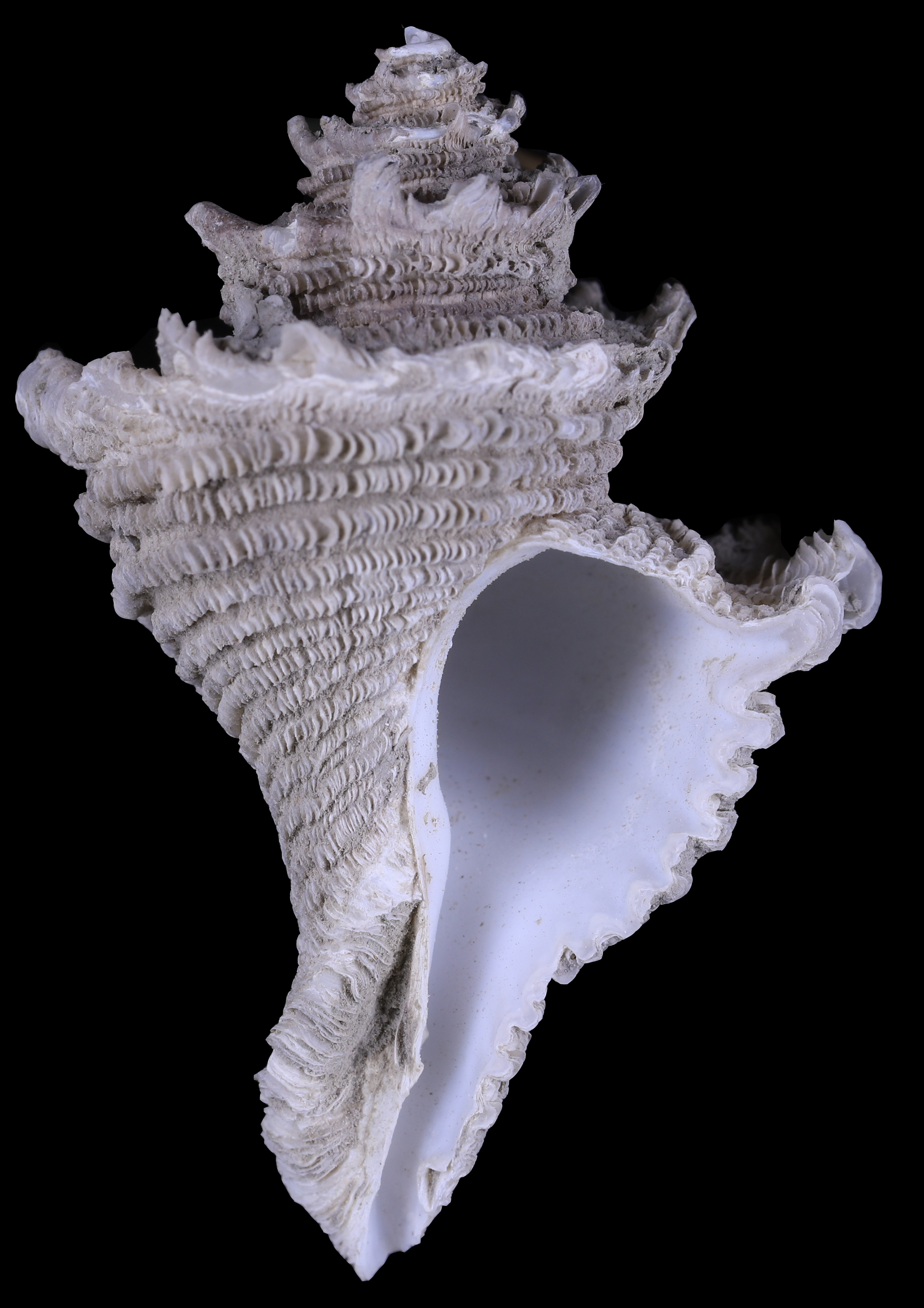
- Shell of Babelomurex nakamigawai (specimen at MNHN, Paris)

Scientific classification
- Kingdom: Animalia
- Phylum: Mollusca
- Class: Gastropoda
- Subclass: Caenogastropoda
- Order: Neogastropoda
- Family: Muricidae
- Genus: Babelomurex
- Species: B. nakamigawai

Binomial name
- Babelomurex nakamigawai (Kuroda, 1959)

Synonyms
- Latiaxis (Babelomurex) nakamigawai Kuroda, 1959 alternative representation (superseded combination); Latiaxis nakamigawai Kuroda, 1959 (superseded combination)

= Babelomurex nakamigawai =

Species of gastropod

Babelomurex nakamigawai is a species of sea snail, a marine gastropod mollusc in the family Muricidae, the murex snails or rock snails.

== Distribution ==
This marine species occurs off Mozambique, Madagascar, Japan, Taiwan, the Philippines, New Zealand, Australia (New South Wales, Queensland) and Vanuatu,
