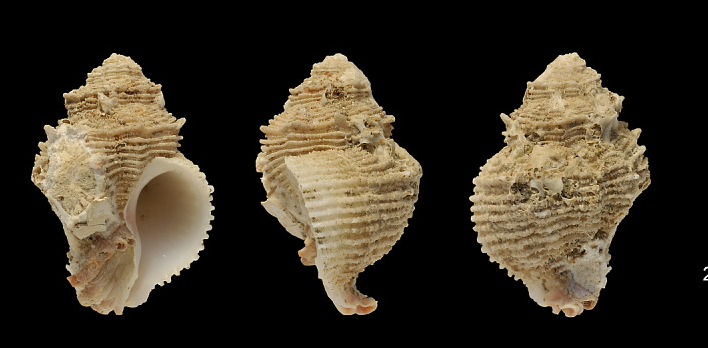
- Shell of Babelomurex microspinosus (holotype at the Smithsonian Institution)

Scientific classification
- Kingdom: Animalia
- Phylum: Mollusca
- Class: Gastropoda
- Subclass: Caenogastropoda
- Order: Neogastropoda
- Family: Muricidae
- Genus: Babelomurex
- Species: B. microspinosus

Binomial name
- Babelomurex microspinosus Kosuge, 1988

= Babelomurex microspinosus =

Species of gastropod

Babelomurex microspinosus is a species of sea snail, a marine gastropod mollusc in the family Muricidae, the murex snails or rock snails.

== Distribution ==
This species occurs in the Indian Ocean off Somalia and Mozambique.
