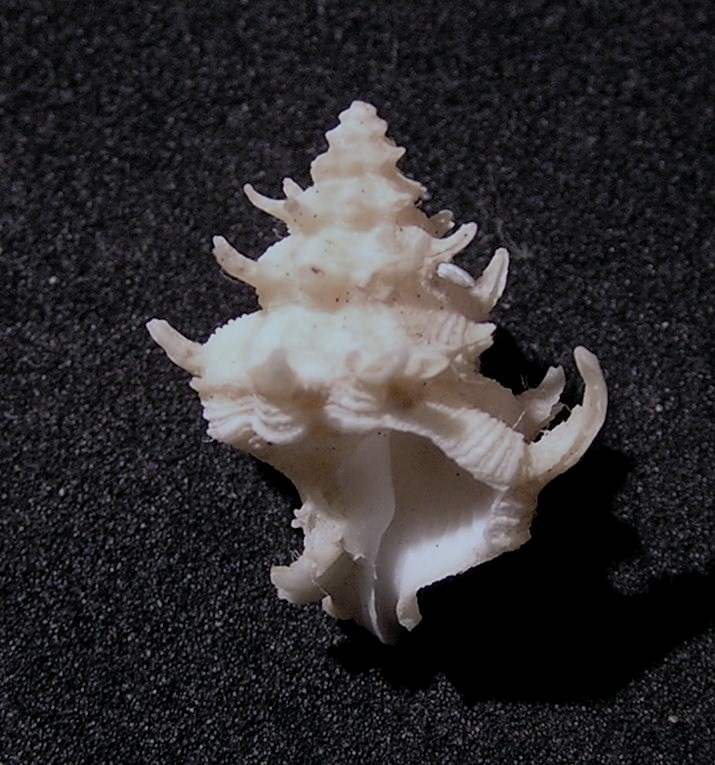
- Apertural view of Babelomurex couturieri

Scientific classification
- Kingdom: Animalia
- Phylum: Mollusca
- Class: Gastropoda
- Subclass: Caenogastropoda
- Order: Neogastropoda
- Family: Muricidae
- Genus: Babelomurex
- Species: B. couturieri

Binomial name
- Babelomurex couturieri (Jousseaume, 1898)

Synonyms
- Latiaxis couturieri Jousseaume, 1898 (basionym); Murex (Langfordia) cuspidifera Dall, 1924 junior subjective synonym; Murex cuspidiferus Dall, 1924

= Babelomurex couturieri =

Species of gastropod

Babelomurex couturieri is a species of sea snail, a marine gastropod mollusc in the family Muricidae, the murex snails or rock snails.

== Description ==
The length of the shell varies between 25 mm (0.98 in) and 60 mm (2.4 in). The holotype measures 37 mm in length and 21 mm in diameter.

(Original description) The shell is white, somewhat solid, and shaped like a kiosk, featuring spiral ridges and fine striations. The spire is elongated and sharply pointed. There are 8 angular whorls; the first ones are crowned above the angle with sickle-shaped spines. The body whorl is concavely depressed at its base, surrounded in that area by very small, spiny ridges, and showing at its periphery two larger, unequal ridges. The suture is crowned above with spines. The aperture is semi-oval and smooth on the inside.

== Distribution ==
This marine species occurs off Vietnam, New Britain (in the Bismarck Archipelago) and Japan.
