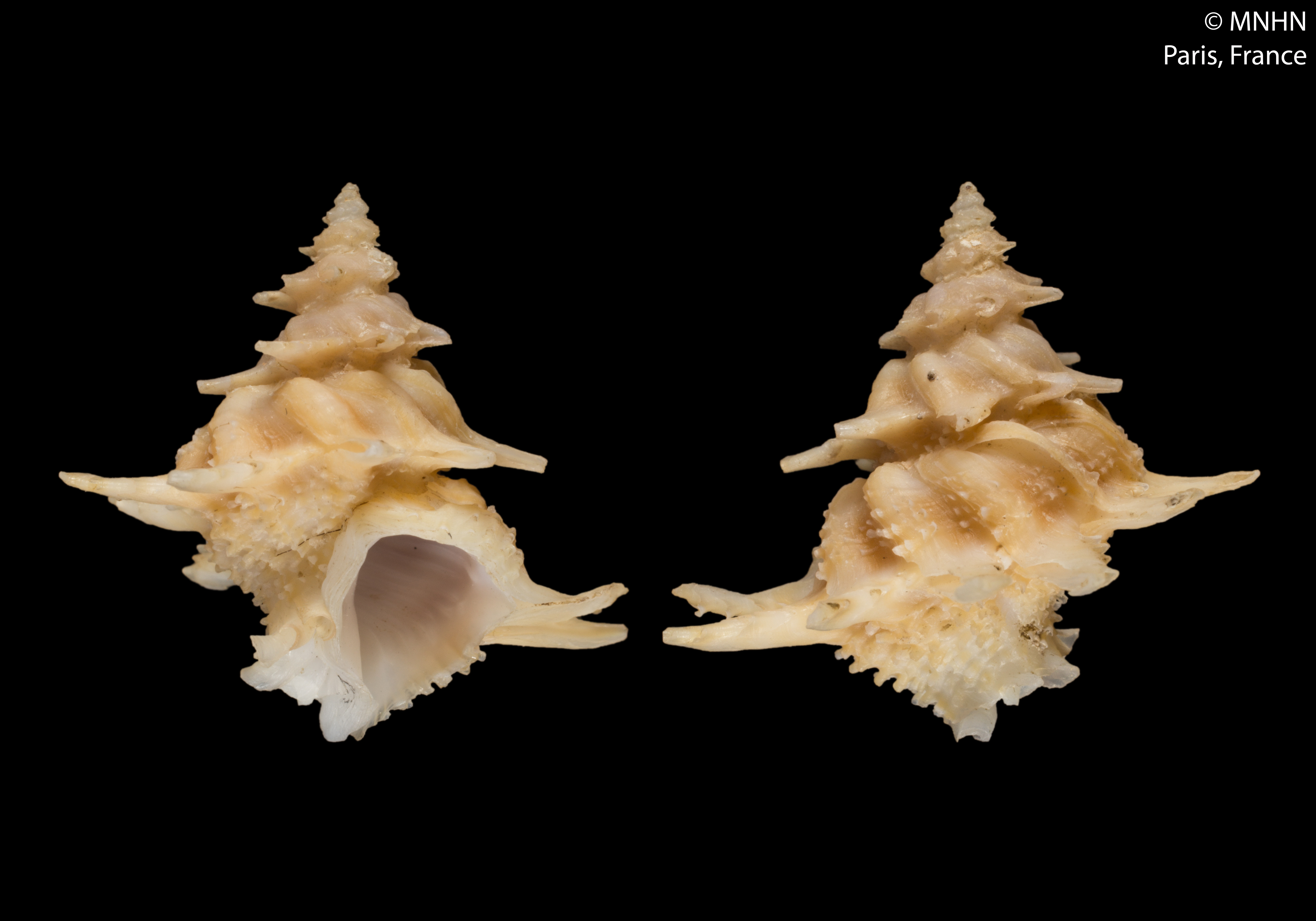
- Shell of Babelomurex virginiae (holotype at MNHN, Paris)

Scientific classification
- Kingdom: Animalia
- Phylum: Mollusca
- Class: Gastropoda
- Subclass: Caenogastropoda
- Order: Neogastropoda
- Family: Muricidae
- Genus: Babelomurex
- Species: B. virginiae

Binomial name
- Babelomurex virginiae Kosuge & Oliverio, 2004

= Babelomurex virginiae =

Species of gastropod

Babelomurex virginiae is a species of sea snail, a marine gastropod mollusc in the family Muricidae, the murex snails or rock snails.

== Description ==
(Original description) The shell is small for the genus, reaching 16–25 mm in height and 15–25 mm in width in the largest adults; the holotype measures 23.5 mm in height and 23.3 mm in width.

The shell is relatively solid and has a rhomboidal outline. The protoconch is eroded in all available specimens. The teleoconch consists of five to six whorls, five in the holotype, with the body whorl accounting for approximately 70% of the total shell height. The spire is high and conical, its sides flat to slightly convex and sharply angulated at the periphery. The suture is distinctly incised.

The body whorl occupies about two-thirds of the total shell height and becomes constricted toward the base. The aperture is moderately large, measuring 8.3 mm in height and 5.5 mm in width in the holotype, and is semicircular in shape. The outer lip bears a finely crenulated edge and is internally lined with lirae; it is angulated at the shoulder and is usually continuous across the peripheral spines. The inner lip is nearly straight and extends into a sharply detached callus. The siphonal canal is moderately long, strongly curved dorsally, and usually bends gently to the right. The umbilicus is deep and narrowly perforate.

The axial sculpture of the teleoconch consists of seven to eleven prosocline axial ribs on the body whorl, eight in the holotype, and seven to nine ribs on the earlier whorls. A single row of scabrous spines occurs at approximately mid-height on the spire, occupying a suprasutural position on the early whorls. Each spine corresponds to an axial rib on the body whorl and is formed by a long, narrow folded lamina with its open side facing the aperture.

The spiral sculpture is composed of twenty-two to twenty-five closely spaced spiral cords, rendered minutely scabrous by finely imbricated lamellae. On the body whorl, ten cords lie above the row of spines and seven to ten below it, ten in the holotype, while five additional cords ornament the siphonal canal. The fasciole bears sharp, scale-like projections. The microsculpture consists of irregular growth lines crossed by extremely fine spiral threads.

The ground colour ranges from whitish to brownish, with darker interspaces.

== Distribution ==
The holotype of this marine species was found off New Caledonia.
