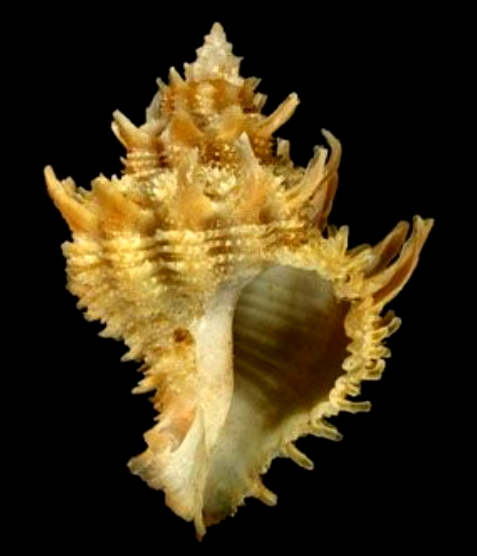
- Shell of Babelomurex shingomarumai (specimen at the Natural History Museum, Rotterdam)

Scientific classification
- Kingdom: Animalia
- Phylum: Mollusca
- Class: Gastropoda
- Subclass: Caenogastropoda
- Order: Neogastropoda
- Family: Muricidae
- Genus: Babelomurex
- Species: B. shingomarumai

Binomial name
- Babelomurex shingomarumai (Kosuge, 1981)

Synonyms
- Latiaxis (Babelomurex) shingomarumai Kosuge, 1981 alternative representation; Latiaxis shingomarumai Kosuge, 1981 (basionym)

= Babelomurex shingomarumai =

Species of gastropod

Babelomurex shingomarumai is a species of sea snail, a marine gastropod mollusc in the family Muricidae, the murex snails or rock snails.

== Description ==
The length of the shell attains 24 mm.

== Distribution ==
This marine species occurs off Japan, the Philippines, New Caledonia, the Loyalty Islands and the Fidji Islands.
