= Babelomurex laevicostatus =

Scientific classification
- Kingdom: Animalia
- Phylum: Mollusca
- Class: Gastropoda
- Subclass: Caenogastropoda
- Order: Neogastropoda
- Superfamily: Muricoidea
- Family: Muricidae
- Subfamily: Coralliophilinae
- Genus: Babelomurex
- Species: B. laevicostatus

Binomial name
- Babelomurex laevicostatus (Kosuge, 1981)

Synonyms
- Latiaxis (Echinolatiaxis) laevicostatus Kosuge, 1981; Latiaxis laevicostatus Kosuge, 1981

Species of gastropod

Babelomurex laevicostatus is a species of sea snail, a marine gastropod mollusk, in the family Muricidae, the murex snails or rock snails.

== Distribution ==
This marine species occurs off the Philippines.
