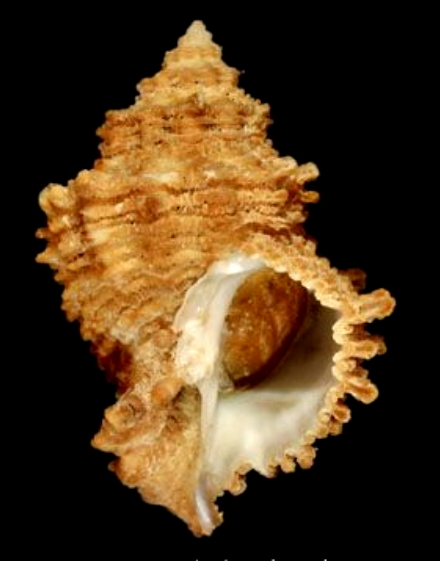
- Shell of Babelomurex tectumsinense (specimen in the Natural History Museum, Rotterdam)

Scientific classification
- Kingdom: Animalia
- Phylum: Mollusca
- Class: Gastropoda
- Subclass: Caenogastropoda
- Order: Neogastropoda
- Family: Muricidae
- Genus: Babelomurex
- Species: B. tectumsinense

Binomial name
- Babelomurex tectumsinense (Deshayes, 1856)

Synonyms
- Babelomurex gili Kosuge, 1990; Babelomurex tectumsinensis [sic] (specific name is a noun, therefore invariable); Coralliophila priolana Settepassi, 1971; Coralliophila mandji P. A. Bernard, 1989 junior subjective synonym; Coralliophila priolana Settepassi, 1977 (unavailable following ICZN art. 11.4); Murex tectumsinense (Deshayes, 1856) (basionym)

= Babelomurex tectumsinense =

Species of gastropod

Babelomurex tectumsinense, common name : the lamellose coral shell, is a species of sea snail, a marine gastropod mollusk in the family Muricidae, the murex snails or rock snails.

== Description ==
The shell size varies between 20 mm and 43 mm.

(Original description in French) The fusifor shell is swollen and spin. They shell is of a uniform rusty-yellow color, with a very sharp apex. It consists of eight to nine whorls, of which the body whorl exceeds half the total length of the shell. The suture is deep but concealed by the nodules. Externally, the shell is covered with longitudinal nodulose ribs, faint on the early whorls but strongly developed on the last. In addition, it bears transverse grooves and ridges. The upper part of the whorls displays small grooves that develop into spines near the suture. The large spines, particularly prominent on the body whorl, form a girdle or serrated crest composed of triangular spinules, obliquely ribbed and ending in sharp points. The body whorl is divided by this crest into two sections: an upper portion bearing seven to eight narrow, equal ribs, and a lower portion with seven strongly marked ribs, between which six smaller ones can be seen. The sinus is oblique and slightly raised; the columella is straight and scarcely calloused. The outer lip is incised and bears eight to ten folds on its inner surface.

== Distribution ==
This species is distributed in the Caribbean Sea along Panama, Colombia, French Guiana and Venezuela and in the Mediterranean Sea; also off Morocco and Lanzarote, Spain.
