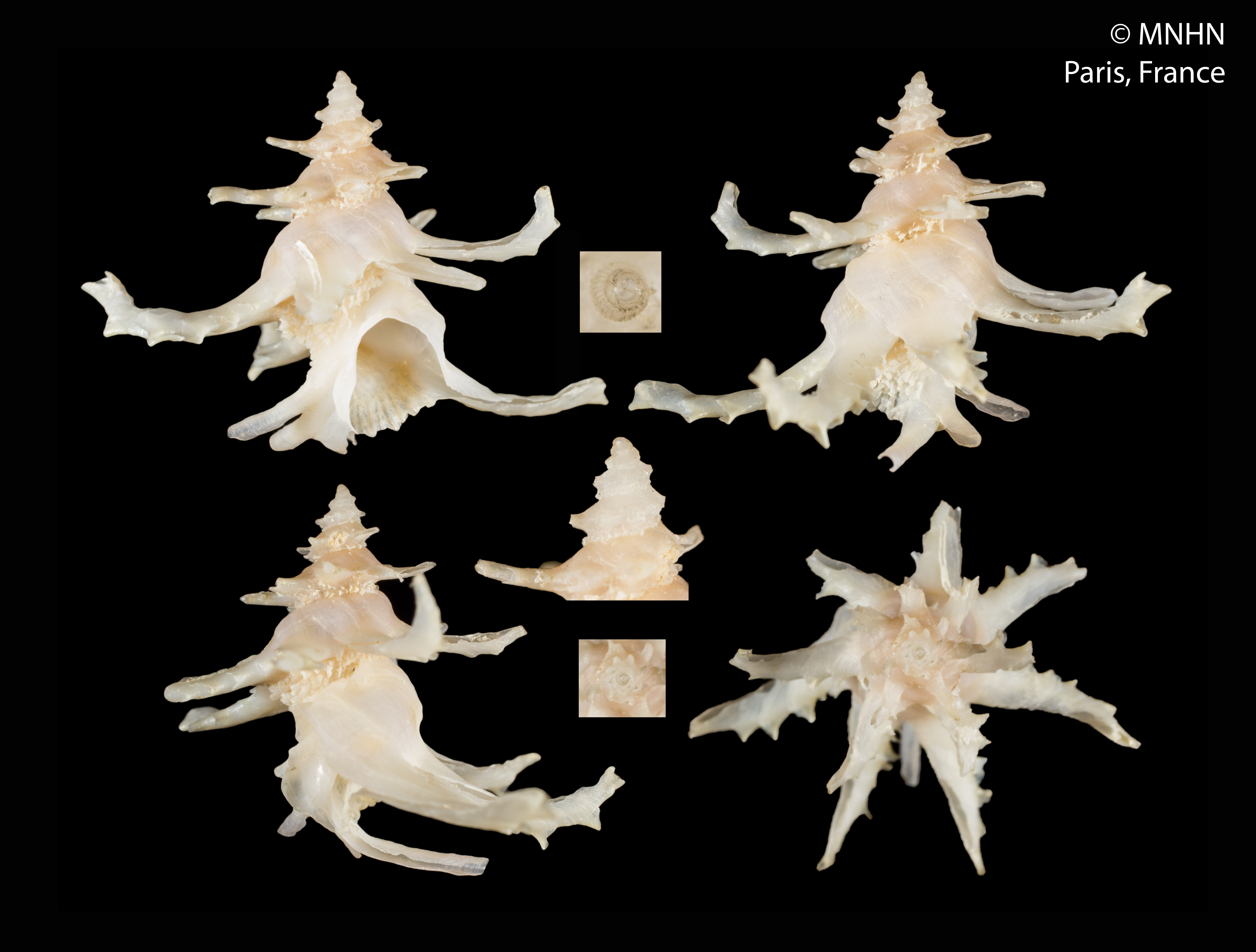
- Shell of Babelomurex natalabies (holotype at MNHN, Paris)

Scientific classification
- Kingdom: Animalia
- Phylum: Mollusca
- Class: Gastropoda
- Subclass: Caenogastropoda
- Order: Neogastropoda
- Family: Muricidae
- Genus: Babelomurex
- Species: B. natalabies

Binomial name
- Babelomurex natalabies Oliverio, 2008

= Babelomurex natalabies =

Species of gastropod

Babelomurex natalabies is a species of sea snail, a marine gastropod mollusc in the family Muricidae, the murex snails or rock snails.

== Distribution ==
The holotype of this marine species was found off New Caledonia on the Norfolk Ridge.
