= Babelomurex bozzettii =

Scientific classification
- Kingdom: Animalia
- Phylum: Mollusca
- Class: Gastropoda
- Subclass: Caenogastropoda
- Order: Neogastropoda
- Superfamily: Muricoidea
- Family: Muricidae
- Subfamily: Coralliophilinae
- Genus: Babelomurex
- Species: B. bozzettii

Binomial name
- Babelomurex bozzettii Kosuge, 1994

Species of gastropod

Babelomurex bozzettii is a species of sea snail, a marine gastropod mollusk, in the family Muricidae, the murex snails or rock snails.

== Distribution ==
This marine species occurs in the Atlantic Ocean off Cape Verde.
