= Babelomurex blowi =

Scientific classification
- Kingdom: Animalia
- Phylum: Mollusca
- Class: Gastropoda
- Subclass: Caenogastropoda
- Order: Neogastropoda
- Superfamily: Muricoidea
- Family: Muricidae
- Subfamily: Coralliophilinae
- Genus: Babelomurex
- Species: B. blowi

Binomial name
- Babelomurex blowi (Ladd, 1976)

Synonyms
- Latiaxis (Tolema) blowi Ladd, 1976; Latiaxis (Tolema) regius Shikama, 1978

Species of gastropod

Babelomurex blowi is a species of sea snail, a marine gastropod mollusk, in the family Muricidae, the murex snails or rock snails.

== Description ==
The length of the holotype measures 28 mm, its diameter is 18.3 mm.

== Distribution ==
This marine species occurs off Vanuatu, the Philippines, and Japan.
