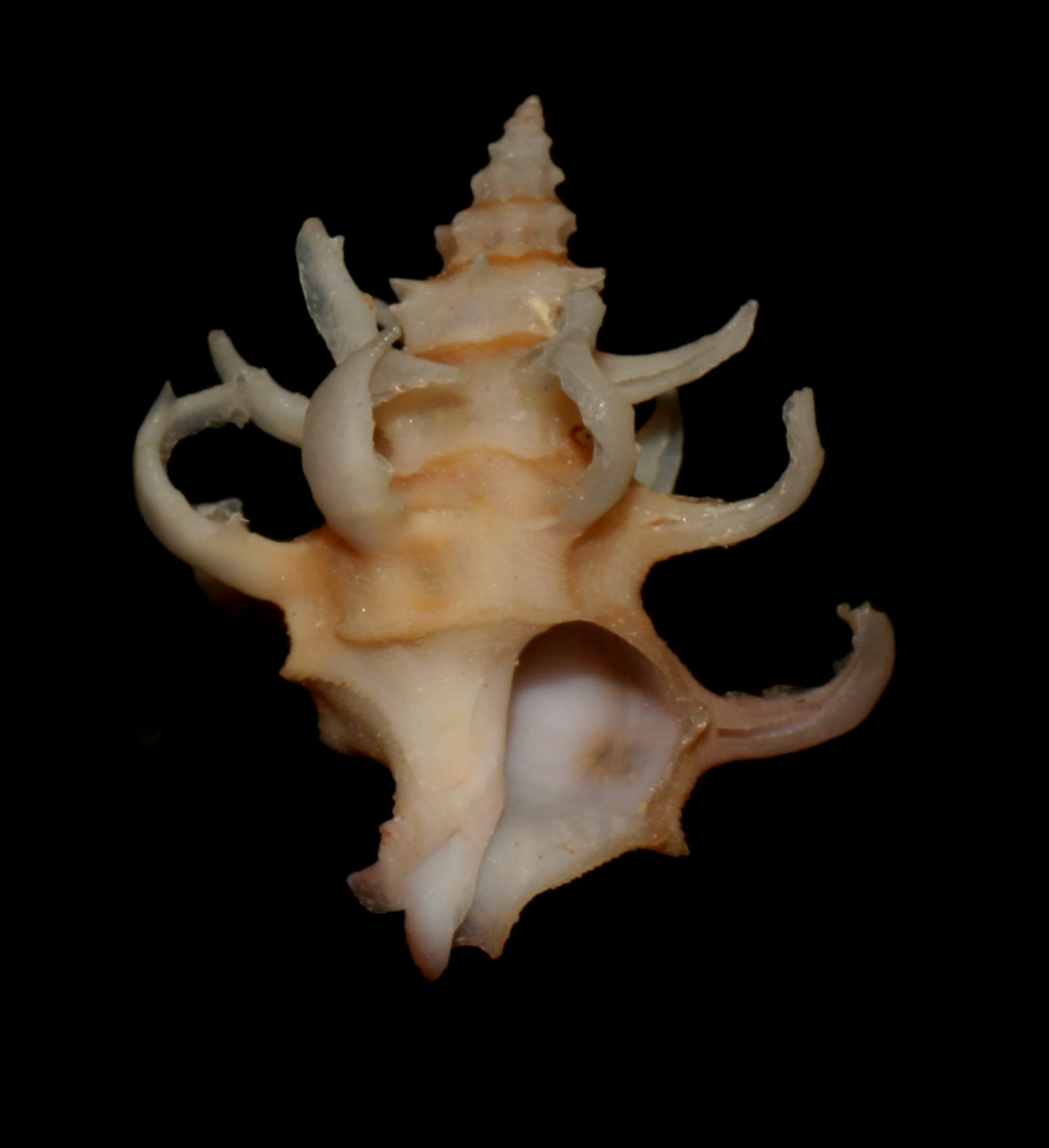
- A shell of Babelomurex cristatus (Kosuge, 1979), 12.4 mm in length, taken in tangle nets at 80 fathoms off Panglao, Bohol Island, in the Philippines.

Scientific classification
- Kingdom: Animalia
- Phylum: Mollusca
- Class: Gastropoda
- Subclass: Caenogastropoda
- Order: Neogastropoda
- Family: Muricidae
- Genus: Babelomurex
- Species: B. cristatus

Binomial name
- Babelomurex cristatus (Kosuge, 1979)

Synonyms
- Latiaxis (Laevilatiaxis) cristatus Kosuge, 1979 superseded combination; Latiaxis cristatus Kosuge, 1979 superseded combination

= Babelomurex cristatus =

Species of gastropod

Babelomurex cristatus is a species of sea snail, a marine gastropod mollusc in the family Muricidae, the murex snails or rock snails.

== Distribution ==
This marine species occurs off the Philippines.
