= Babelomurex meimiaoae =

Scientific classification
- Kingdom: Animalia
- Phylum: Mollusca
- Class: Gastropoda
- Subclass: Caenogastropoda
- Order: Neogastropoda
- Superfamily: Muricoidea
- Family: Muricidae
- Subfamily: Coralliophilinae
- Genus: Babelomurex
- Species: B. meimiaoae

Binomial name
- Babelomurex meimiaoae S.-I Huang & Y.-F. Huang, 2019

Species of gastropod

Babelomurex meimiaoae is a species of sea snail, a marine gastropod mollusk, in the family Muricidae, the murex snails or rock snails.

== Distribution ==
This species occurs in the East China Sea.
