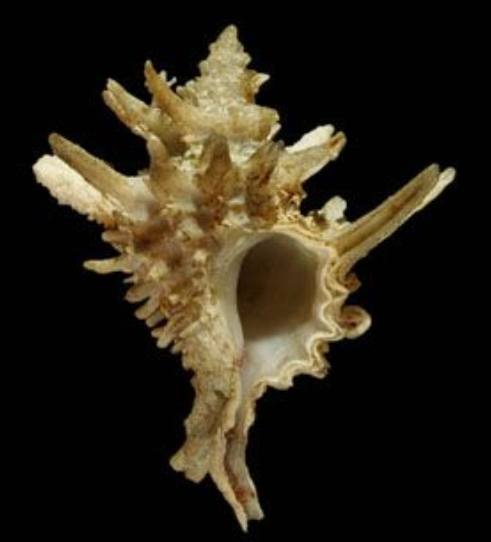
- Shell of Babelomurex centimanus (specimen at the Natural History Museum, Rotterdam)

Scientific classification
- Kingdom: Animalia
- Phylum: Mollusca
- Class: Gastropoda
- Subclass: Caenogastropoda
- Order: Neogastropoda
- Family: Muricidae
- Genus: Babelomurex
- Species: B. centimanus

Binomial name
- Babelomurex centimanus Kosuge, 1985

Synonyms
- Babelomurex (Echinolatiaxis) centimanus Kosuge, 1985 superseded combination

= Babelomurex centimanus =

Species of gastropod

Babelomurex centimanus is a species of sea snail, a marine gastropod mollusc in the family Muricidae, the murex snails or rock snails.

== Description ==
The length of the shell attains 22 mm.

== Distribution ==
This marine species occurs off the Philippines.
