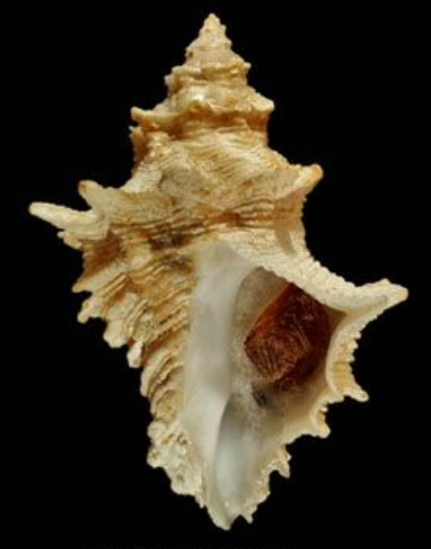
- Shell of Babelomurex oldroydi (specimen at the Natural History Museum, Rotterdam)

Scientific classification
- Kingdom: Animalia
- Phylum: Mollusca
- Class: Gastropoda
- Subclass: Caenogastropoda
- Order: Neogastropoda
- Superfamily: Muricoidea
- Family: Muricidae
- Subfamily: Coralliophilinae
- Genus: Babelomurex
- Species: B. oldroydi

Binomial name
- Babelomurex oldroydi (I. S. Oldroyd, 1929)

Synonyms
- Coralliophila oldroydi I. S. Oldroyd, 1929 (original combination)

= Babelomurex oldroydi =

Species of gastropod

Babelomurex oldroydi is a species of sea snail, a marine gastropod mollusk, in the family Muricidae, the murex snails or rock snails.

== Description ==
The length of the adult shell is 47 mm.

(Original description) The shell is large and heavy. The aperture is one-half the length of the shell, featuring a row of horizontal scales on the shoulder and four heavy spiral ridges below the shoulder on the body whorl. There are fine spiral ridges on all of the whorls. The aperture is greenish-white, and the siphonal canal is short.

This species differs from Babelomurex hindsi (Carpenter, 1857) in having nearly straight shoulders and only a faint trace of scales where the body whorl joins the next whorl. In contrast, the shoulders in B. hindsi are very sloping.

== Distribution ==
This marine species was found off Catalina Island, California.
