= Babelomurex mediopacificus =

Scientific classification
- Kingdom: Animalia
- Phylum: Mollusca
- Class: Gastropoda
- Subclass: Caenogastropoda
- Order: Neogastropoda
- Superfamily: Muricoidea
- Family: Muricidae
- Subfamily: Coralliophilinae
- Genus: Babelomurex
- Species: B. mediopacificus

Binomial name
- Babelomurex mediopacificus (Kosuge, 1979)

Synonyms
- Latiaxis (Lamellatiaxis) mediopacificus Kosuge, 1979; Latiaxis mediopacificus Kosuge, 1979

Species of gastropod

Babelomurex mediopacificus is a species of sea snail, a marine gastropod mollusk, in the family Muricidae, the murex snails or rock snails.

== Distribution ==
This marine species occurs off New Caledonia, French Polynesia and the Austral Islands.
