= Babelomurex deroyorum =

Scientific classification
- Kingdom: Animalia
- Phylum: Mollusca
- Class: Gastropoda
- Subclass: Caenogastropoda
- Order: Neogastropoda
- Superfamily: Muricoidea
- Family: Muricidae
- Subfamily: Coralliophilinae
- Genus: Babelomurex
- Species: B. deroyorum

Binomial name
- Babelomurex deroyorum D'Attilio & Myers, 1984

Species of gastropod

Babelomurex deroyorum is a species of sea snail, a marine gastropod mollusk, in the family Muricidae, the murex snails or rock snails.

== Description ==
The holotype shell measures 28.8 mm in length and 29.3 mm in diameter.

== Distribution ==
This marine species occurs off the Galápagos Islands, Ecuador at depths between 75 m and 100 m.
