= Babelomurex tuberosus =

Scientific classification
- Kingdom: Animalia
- Phylum: Mollusca
- Class: Gastropoda
- Subclass: Caenogastropoda
- Order: Neogastropoda
- Family: Muricidae
- Genus: Babelomurex
- Species: B. tuberosus

Binomial name
- Babelomurex tuberosus (Kosuge, 1980)

Synonyms
- Latiaxis (Echinolatiaxis) tuberosus Kosuge, 1980 alternative representation; Latiaxis tuberosus Kosuge, 1980 (original combination)

Species of gastropod

Babelomurex tuberosus is a species of sea snail, a marine gastropod mollusc in the family Muricidae, the murex snails or rock snails.

== Distribution ==
This marine species occurs off Taiwan, the Philippines and New Caledonia.
