= Babelomurex squalidus =

Scientific classification
- Kingdom: Animalia
- Phylum: Mollusca
- Class: Gastropoda
- Subclass: Caenogastropoda
- Order: Neogastropoda
- Superfamily: Muricoidea
- Family: Muricidae
- Subfamily: Coralliophilinae
- Genus: Babelomurex
- Species: B. squalidus

Binomial name
- Babelomurex squalidus Kosuge, 1985

Synonyms
- Babelomurex (Echinolatiaxis) squalida Kosuge, 1985 incorrect grammatical agreement of specific epithet (and unaccepted subgenus)

Species of gastropod

Babelomurex squalidus is a species of sea snail, a marine gastropod mollusk, in the family Muricidae, the murex snails or rock snails.

== Distribution ==
This marine species occurs off the Philippines.
