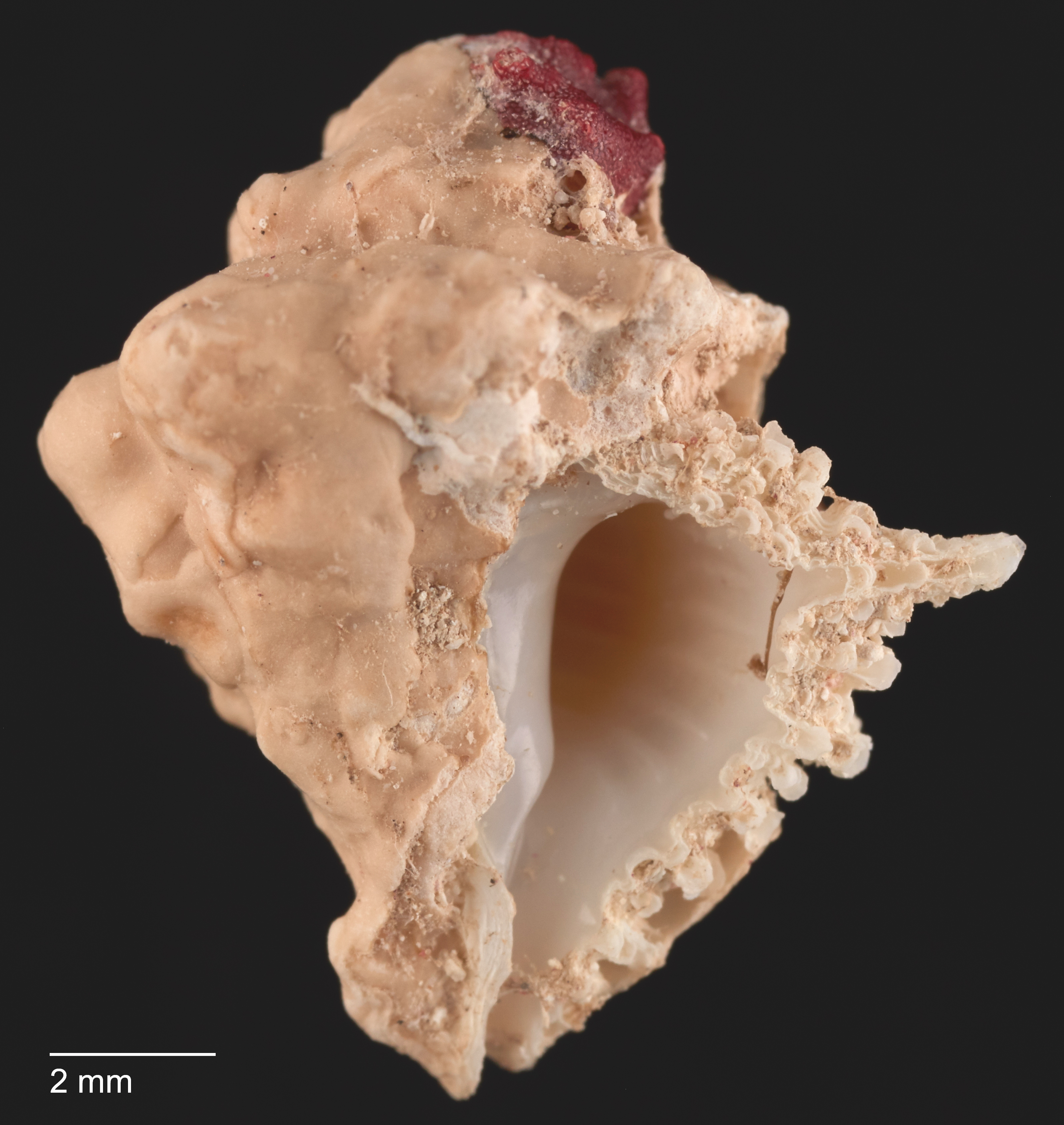
- Shell of Babelomurex scalariformis (specimen at MNHN, Paris)

Scientific classification
- Kingdom: Animalia
- Phylum: Mollusca
- Class: Gastropoda
- Subclass: Caenogastropoda
- Order: Neogastropoda
- Family: Muricidae
- Genus: Babelomurex
- Species: B. scalariformis

Binomial name
- Babelomurex scalariformis (Lamarck, 1822)

Synonyms
- Coralliophila scalariformis (Lamarck, 1822) superseded combination; Purpura scalariformis Lamarck, 1822 superseded combination (original combination)

= Babelomurex scalariformis =

Species of gastropod

Babelomurex scalariformis, common name the staircase coralsnail, is a species of sea snail, a marine gastropod mollusc in the family Muricidae, the murex snails or rock snails.

== Description ==
(Original description) The shell is ovate, scalariform, umbilicate, and white. The whorls are decussated, angulate-carinate above, and flat on their upper surface. The spire is exserted. The aperture is rounded, and the inner margin of the outer lip is grooved.

== Distribution ==
This marine species occurs in the Gulf of Mexico and in the Caribbean Sea off Martinique and Guadeloupe.
