= Babelomurex ricinuloides =

Scientific classification
- Kingdom: Animalia
- Phylum: Mollusca
- Class: Gastropoda
- Subclass: Caenogastropoda
- Order: Neogastropoda
- Family: Muricidae
- Genus: Babelomurex
- Species: B. ricinuloides

Binomial name
- Babelomurex ricinuloides (Schepman, 1911)

Species of gastropod

Babelomurex ricinuloides is a species of sea snail, a marine gastropod mollusc in the family Muricidae, the murex snails or rock snails.

== Description ==
An uncommon deepwater operculated species: shell size 30-35 mm.

== Distribution ==
Philippines.
