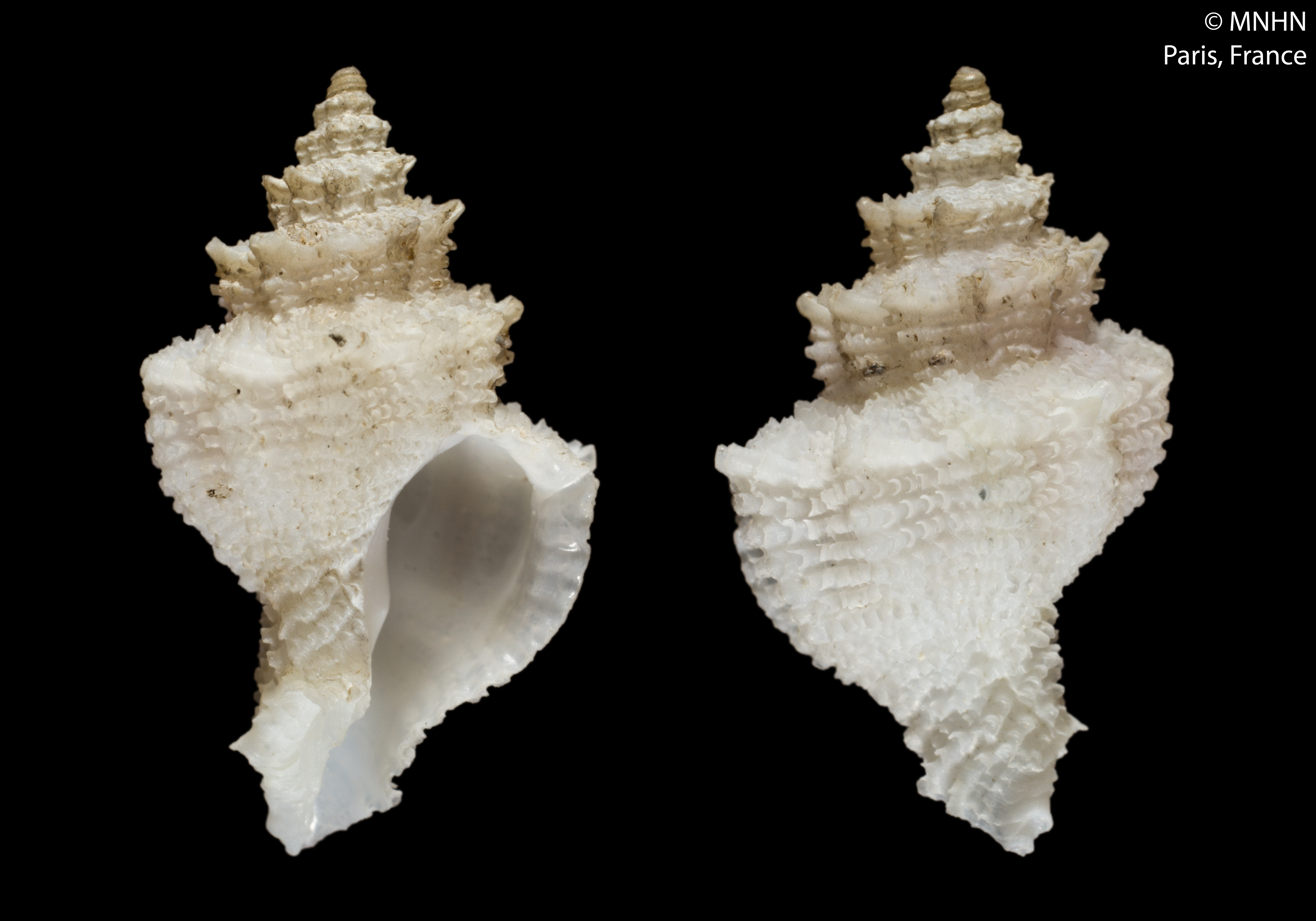
- Shell of Babelomurex atlantidis (holotype at the MNHN, Paris)

Scientific classification
- Kingdom: Animalia
- Phylum: Mollusca
- Class: Gastropoda
- Subclass: Caenogastropoda
- Order: Neogastropoda
- Family: Muricidae
- Genus: Babelomurex
- Species: B. atlantidis

Binomial name
- Babelomurex atlantidis Oliverio & Gofas, 2006

= Babelomurex atlantidis =

Species of gastropod

Babelomurex atlantidis is a species of sea snail, a marine gastropod mollusc in the family Muricidae, the murex snails or rock snails.

== Distribution ==
This marine species occurs in the Northeast Atlantic Ocean: only known with certainty from Great Meteor, Hyères, Irving and Atlantis seamounts, moderately common in 310-640 m; shells also collected on Lion seamount.
