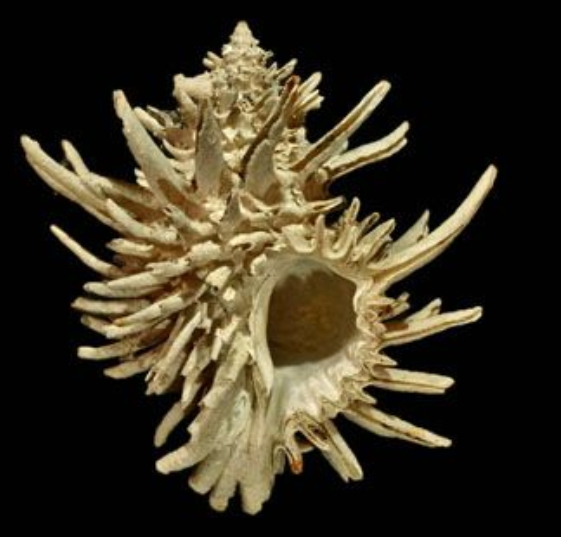
- Shell of Babelomurex echinatus (specimen at the Natural History Museum, Rotterdam)

Scientific classification
- Kingdom: Animalia
- Phylum: Mollusca
- Class: Gastropoda
- Subclass: Caenogastropoda
- Order: Neogastropoda
- Family: Muricidae
- Genus: Babelomurex
- Species: B. echinatus

Binomial name
- Babelomurex echinatus (Azuma, M., 1970)

Synonyms
- Latiaxis echinatus M. Azuma, 1960 superseded combination

= Babelomurex echinatus =

Species of gastropod

Babelomurex echinatus is a species of sea snail, a marine gastropod mollusc in the family Muricidae, the murex snails or rock snails.

== Description ==
Shell size 26-35 mm.

== Distribution ==
This marine species occurs off Japan; dredged at 100 meters depth; also off Taiwan and the Philippines.
