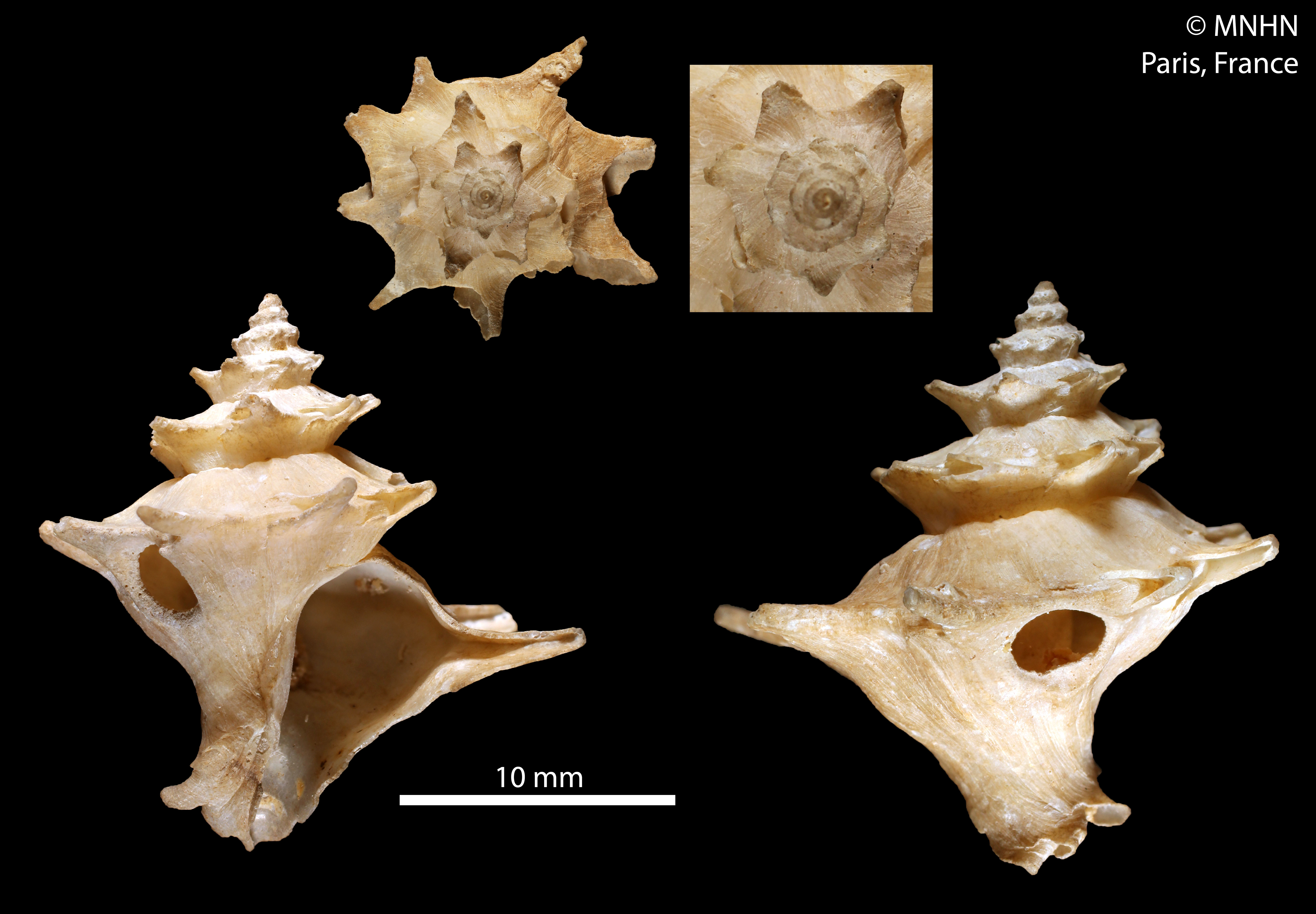
- Shell of Babelomurex glaber (paratype at MNHN, Paris)

Scientific classification
- Kingdom: Animalia
- Phylum: Mollusca
- Class: Gastropoda
- Subclass: Caenogastropoda
- Order: Neogastropoda
- Family: Muricidae
- Genus: Babelomurex
- Species: B. glaber

Binomial name
- Babelomurex glaber Kosuge, 1998

Synonyms
- Babelomurex (Laevilatiaxis) glaber Kosuge, 1998

= Babelomurex glaber =

Species of gastropod

Babelomurex glaber is a species of sea snail, a marine gastropod mollusc in the family Muricidae, the murex snails or rock snails.

== Distribution ==
This marine species occurs off New Caledonia.
