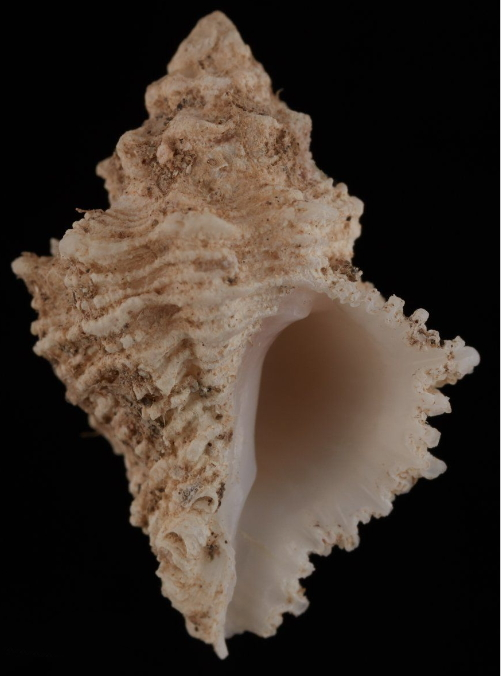
- Shell of Babelomurex mansfieldi (specimen at MNHN, Paris)

Scientific classification
- Kingdom: Animalia
- Phylum: Mollusca
- Class: Gastropoda
- Subclass: Caenogastropoda
- Order: Neogastropoda
- Family: Muricidae
- Genus: Babelomurex
- Species: B. mansfieldi

Binomial name
- Babelomurex mansfieldi (McGinty, 1940)

Synonyms
- Coralliophila mansfieldi (McGinty, 1940) superseded combination; † Muricidea mansfieldi McGinty, 1940 superseded combination

= Babelomurex mansfieldi =

Species of gastropod

Babelomurex mansfieldi is a species of sea snail, a marine gastropod mollusc in the family Muricidae, the murex snails or rock snails.

== Description ==
The length of the holotype attains 20 mm, its diameter 13 mm.

== Distribution ==
This species occurs in the Caribbean Sea off Florida, Guadeloupe and Martinique; also in the Atlantic Ocean off Brazil.

Fossils of this marine species were found in southern Florida.
