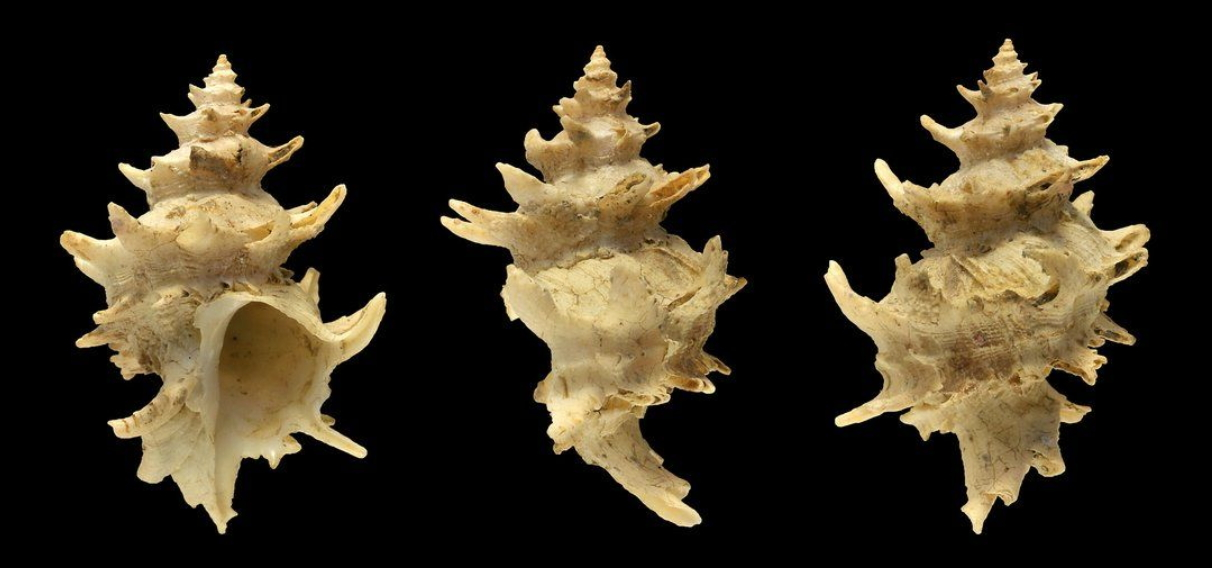
- Shell of Babelomurex jeanneae (holotype at the National Museum of Natural History, Smithsonian Institution)

Scientific classification
- Kingdom: Animalia
- Phylum: Mollusca
- Class: Gastropoda
- Subclass: Caenogastropoda
- Order: Neogastropoda
- Family: Muricidae
- Genus: Babelomurex
- Species: B. jeanneae

Binomial name
- Babelomurex jeanneae D'Attilio & B. W. Myers, 1984

Synonyms
- Babelomurex multispinosus (Shikama, 1966); Babelomurex pagodus (A. Adams, 1853) sensu Hirase, 1934 misapplication; Babelomurex spinosus (Y. Hirase, 1908); Coralliophila spinosa Dall, 1925 (invalid: synonym and secondary junior homonym of Latiaxis spinosus Hirase, 1908); Latiaxis (Babelomurex) pagodus (A. Adams, 1853) sensu S. Hirase, 1934 misapplication; Latiaxis (Babelomurex) pagodus f. multispinosus Shikama, 1966 (unavailable name: established at the rank of "forma"); Latiaxis (Tolema) pagodus (A. Adams, 1853) sensu Hirase, 1934 misapplication; Latiaxis jeanneae (D'Attilio & B. W. Myers, 1984); Latiaxis spinosus Y. Hirase, 1908 ( invalid: secondary junior homonym of Coralliophila debughiae var. spinosa Dall, 1889)

= Babelomurex jeanneae =

Species of gastropod

Babelomurex jeanneae is a species of sea snail, a marine gastropod mollusc in the family Muricidae, the murex snails or rock snails.

== Description ==
The length of the holotype attains 21.5 mm, its diameter 25.5 mm.

== Distribution ==
This marine species occurs off the Japan, the Philippines and New Caledonia.
