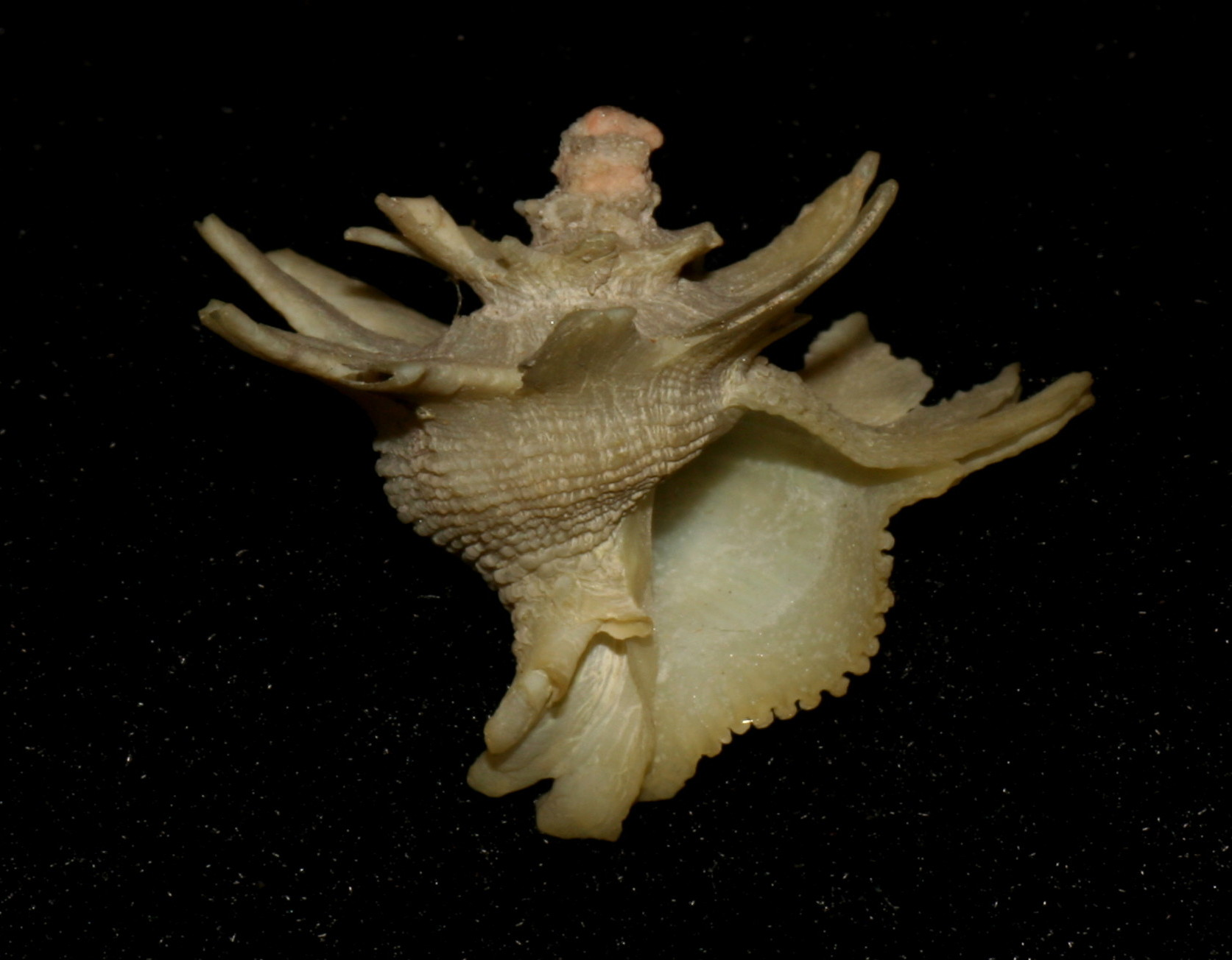
- A shell of Babelomurex latipinnatus (Azuma, 1961), 20.4 mm in length, trawled at 180 m depth in the South China Sea in China.

Scientific classification
- Kingdom: Animalia
- Phylum: Mollusca
- Class: Gastropoda
- Subclass: Caenogastropoda
- Order: Neogastropoda
- Family: Muricidae
- Genus: Babelomurex
- Species: B. latipinnatus

Binomial name
- Babelomurex latipinnatus (Azuma, 1961)

Synonyms
- Latiaxis latipinnatus M. Azuma, 1961

= Babelomurex latipinnatus =

Species of gastropod

Babelomurex latipinnatus is a species of sea snail, a marine gastropod mollusc in the family Muricidae, the murex snails or rock snails.

== Description ==
The length of the holotype attains 25 mm, its diameter is 37 mm.

== Distribution ==
This marine species occurs off Japan.
