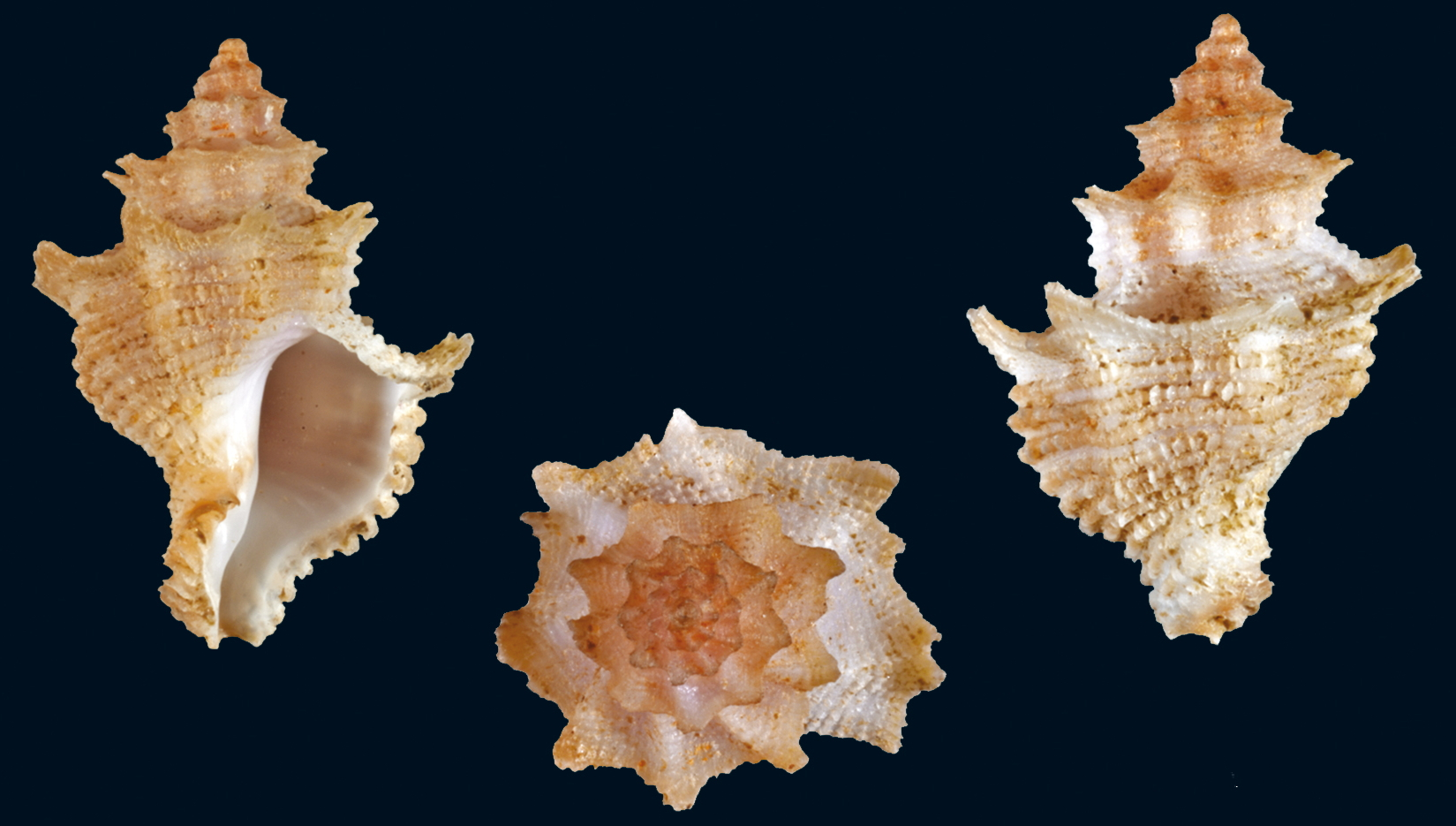
- Shell of Babelomurex bayeri (holotype at MNHN, paris)

Scientific classification
- Kingdom: Animalia
- Phylum: Mollusca
- Class: Gastropoda
- Subclass: Caenogastropoda
- Order: Neogastropoda
- Family: Muricidae
- Genus: Babelomurex
- Species: B. bayeri

Binomial name
- Babelomurex bayeri Garrigues, D. Lamy & Zuccon, 2022

= Babelomurex bayeri =

Species of gastropod

Babelomurex bayeri is a species of sea snail, a marine gastropod mollusc in the family Muricidae, the murex snails or rock snails.

== Description ==
The length of the shell attains 16.2 mm.

== Distribution ==
This marine species occurs off French Guiana.
