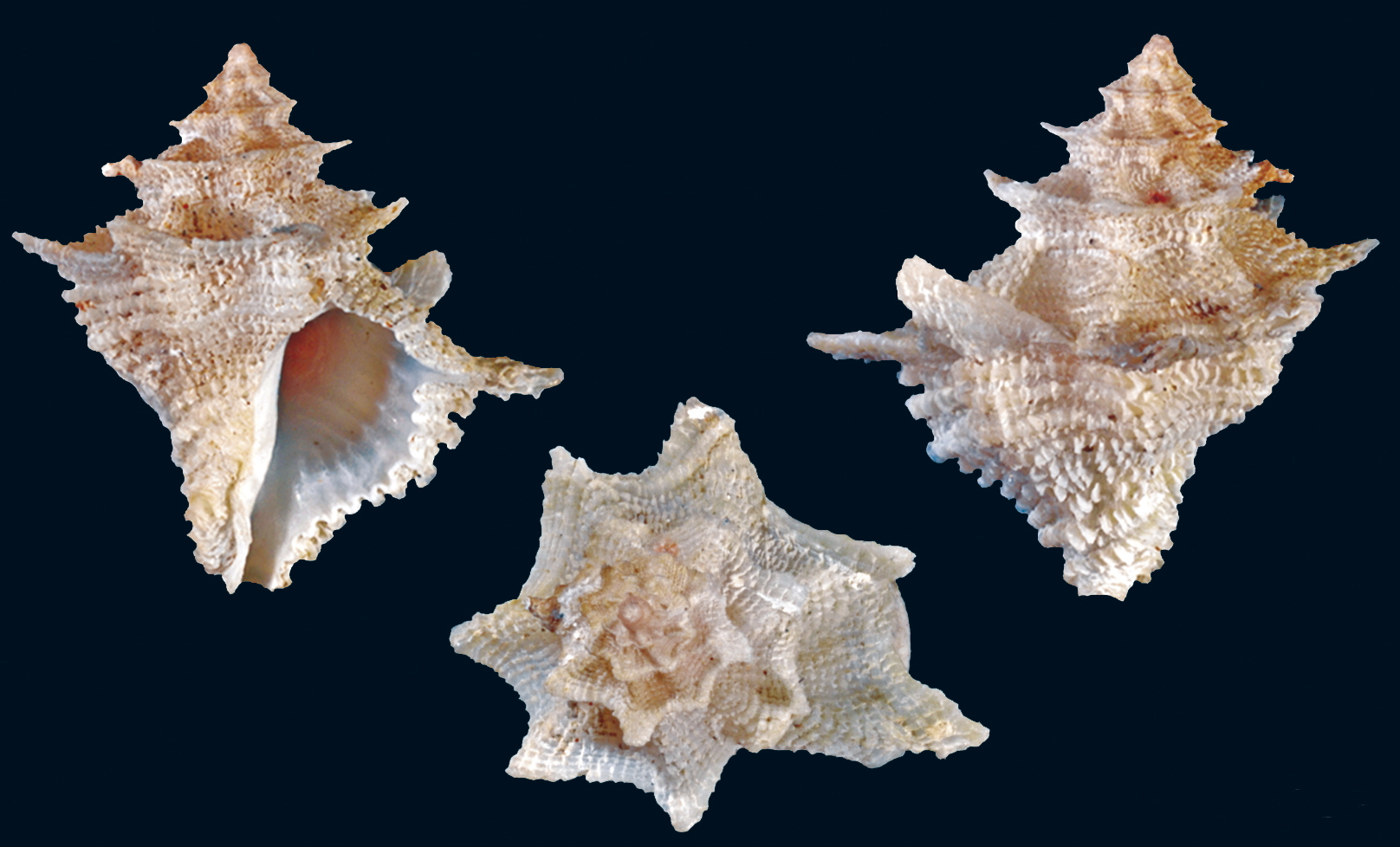
- Shell of Babelomurex stupa (holotype at the MNHN, Paris)

Scientific classification
- Kingdom: Animalia
- Phylum: Mollusca
- Class: Gastropoda
- Subclass: Caenogastropoda
- Order: Neogastropoda
- Family: Muricidae
- Genus: Babelomurex
- Species: B. stupa

Binomial name
- Babelomurex stupa Garrigues, D. Lamy & Zuccon, 2022

= Babelomurex stupa =

Species of gastropod

Babelomurex stupa is a species of sea snail, a marine gastropod mollusc in the family Muricidae, the murex snails or rock snails.

== Description ==
The length of the shell attains 12 mm.

== Distribution ==
This marine species occurs off Martinique.
