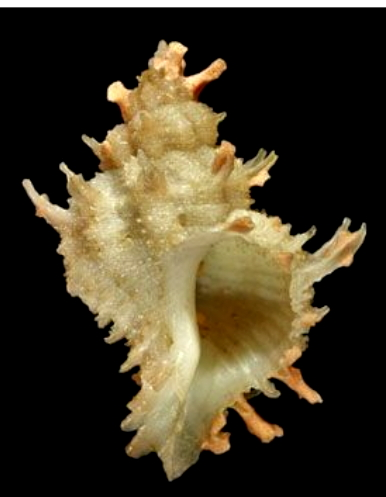
- Shell of Babelomurex purpuraterminus (specimen at the Natural History Museum, Rotterdam)

Scientific classification
- Kingdom: Animalia
- Phylum: Mollusca
- Class: Gastropoda
- Subclass: Caenogastropoda
- Order: Neogastropoda
- Family: Muricidae
- Genus: Babelomurex
- Species: B. purpuraterminus

Binomial name
- Babelomurex purpuraterminus (Kosuge, 1979)

Synonyms
- Latiaxis (Babelomurex) purpuraterminus Kosuge, 1979; Latiaxis purpuraterminus Kosuge, 1979

= Babelomurex purpuraterminus =

Species of gastropod

Babelomurex purpuraterminus is a species of sea snail, a marine gastropod mollusc in the family Muricidae, the murex snails or rock snails.

== Description ==
The length of the shell attains 25 mm.

== Distribution ==
This marine species occurs off the Philippines, New Caledonia and Vanuatu.
