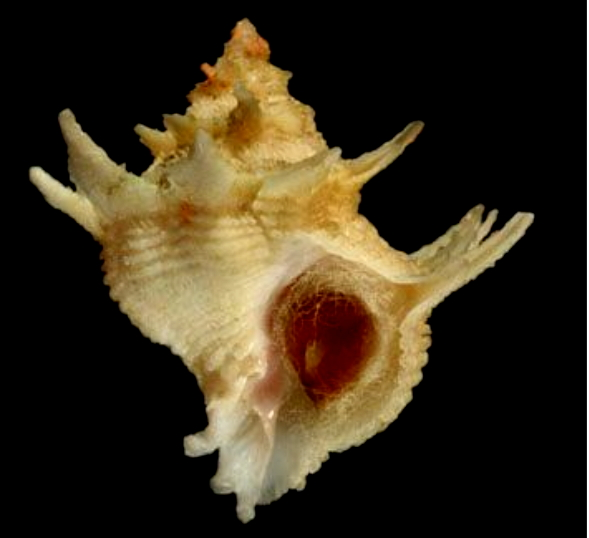
- Shell of Babelomurex stenospinus (specimen at Natural History Museum, Rotterdam)

Scientific classification
- Kingdom: Animalia
- Phylum: Mollusca
- Class: Gastropoda
- Subclass: Caenogastropoda
- Order: Neogastropoda
- Family: Muricidae
- Genus: Babelomurex
- Species: B. stenospinus

Binomial name
- Babelomurex stenospinus (Kuroda, 1961)

Synonyms
- Latiaxis stenospinus Kuroda, 1961

= Babelomurex stenospinus =

Species of gastropod

Babelomurex stenospinus is a species of sea snail, a marine gastropod mollusc in the family Muricidae, the murex snails or rock snails.

== Description ==
The length of the shell attains 26 mm.

== Distribution ==
This marine species occurs off Japan.
