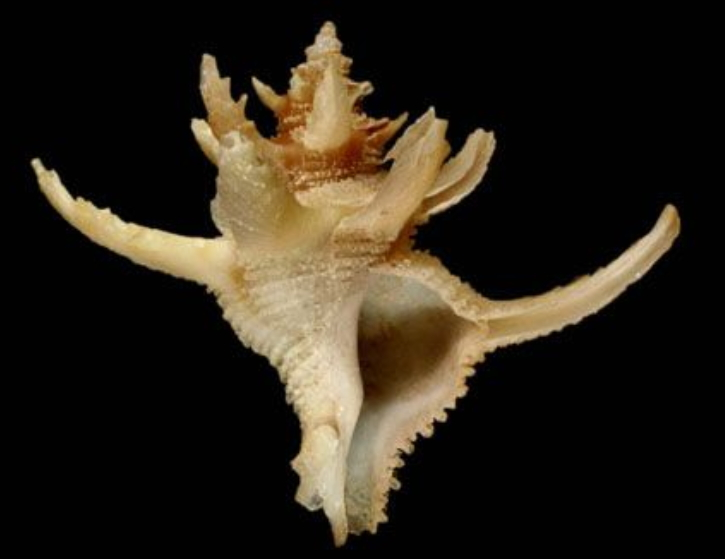
- Shell of Babelomurex kinoshitai (specimen at the Natural History Museum Rotterdam)

Scientific classification
- Kingdom: Animalia
- Phylum: Mollusca
- Class: Gastropoda
- Subclass: Caenogastropoda
- Order: Neogastropoda
- Family: Muricidae
- Genus: Babelomurex
- Species: B. kinoshitai

Binomial name
- Babelomurex kinoshitai (Fulton, 1930)

Synonyms
- Latiaxis kinoshitai Fulton, 1930 · (original combination)

= Babelomurex kinoshitai =

Species of gastropod

Babelomurex kinoshitai is a species of sea snail, a marine gastropod mollusc in the family Muricidae, the murex snails or rock snails.

== Description ==
The length of the shell attains 36 mm, its diameter 29 mm.

(Original description) This creamy-white shell is allied to Babelomurex deburghiae and Babelomurex purpuratus but has a longer spire, is thicker and has less numerous spiral cords than either of those species.

== Distribution ==
The marine species occurs off Japan, Taiwan and the Philippines.
