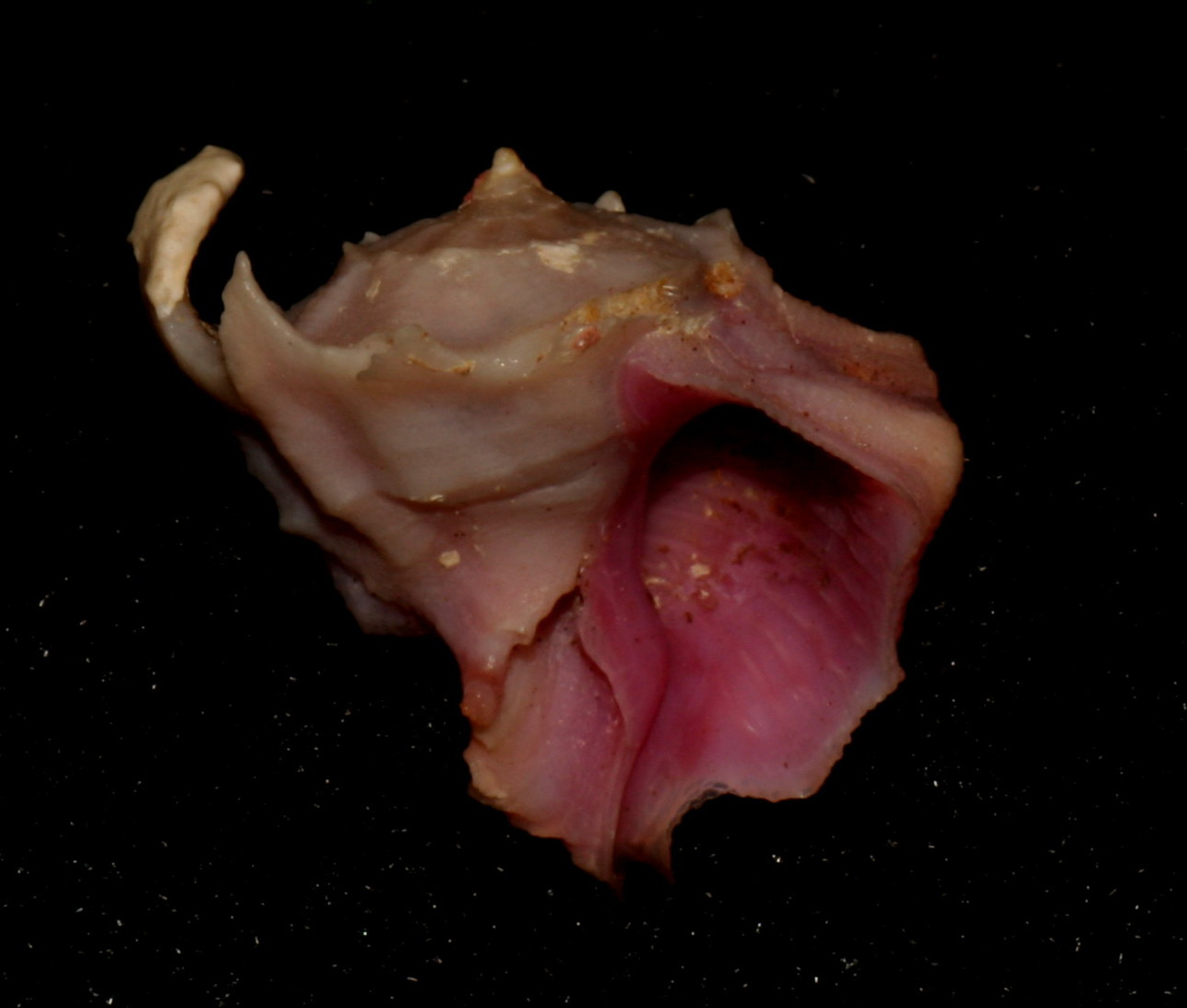
- Shell of Babelomurex longispinosus (Suzuki, 1972), measuring 16.3 mm in length, trawled at 80 fathoms, off Balut Island, in the Philippines.

Scientific classification
- Kingdom: Animalia
- Phylum: Mollusca
- Class: Gastropoda
- Subclass: Caenogastropoda
- Order: Neogastropoda
- Family: Muricidae
- Genus: Babelomurex
- Species: B. longispinosus

Binomial name
- Babelomurex longispinosus (Suzuki, 1972)

Synonyms
- Babelomurex (Babelomurex) longispinosus (M. Suzuki, 1972); Latiaxis longispinosus M. Suzuki, 1972 (original combination); Latiaxis pisori D'Attilio & Emerson, 1980

= Babelomurex longispinosus =

Species of gastropod

Babelomurex longispinosus is a species of sea snail, a marine gastropod mollusc in the family Muricidae, the murex snails or rock snails.

== Distribution ==
This marine species occurs off the Philippines and Japan
