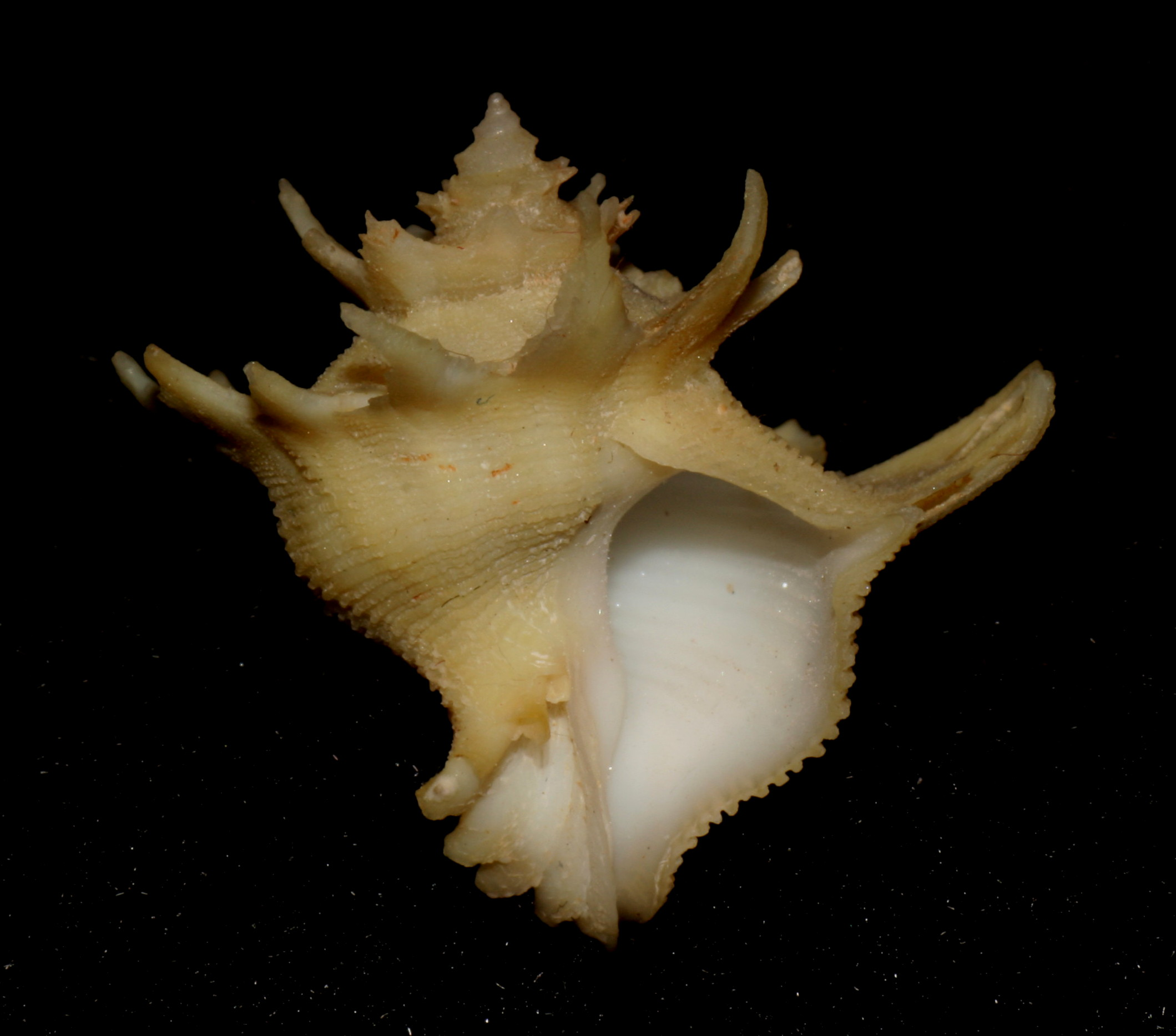
- A shell of Babelomurex deburghiae (Reeve, 1857), 22.6 mm in length, taken in tangle nets at 150 to 200 m, off Panglao Island, Bohol, in the Philippines

Scientific classification
- Kingdom: Animalia
- Phylum: Mollusca
- Class: Gastropoda
- Subclass: Caenogastropoda
- Order: Neogastropoda
- Family: Muricidae
- Subfamily: Coralliophilinae
- Genus: Babelomurex; Coen, 1922

Type species
- Fusus babelis Requien, 1848

Synonyms
- Babelomurex (Lamellatiaxis) Habe & Kosuge, 1970; Echinolatiaxis Kosuge, 1979; Laevilatiaxis Kosuge, 1979; Lamellatiaxis Habe & Kosuge, 1970; Langfordia Dall, 1924; Latiaxis (Babelomurex) Coen, 1922; Latiaxis (Echinolatiaxis) Kosuge, 1979; Latiaxis (Laevilatiaxis) Kosuge, 1979; Latiaxis (Lamellatiaxis) Habe & Kosuge, 1970; Latiaxis (Tolema) Iredale, 1929; Pseudomurex (Babelomurex) Coen, 1922 (original rank); Tarantellaxis Habe, 1970; Tolema Iredale, 1929

= Babelomurex =

Genus of gastropods

Babelomurex is a genus of sea snails, marine gastropod molluscs in the subfamily Coralliophilinae of the family Muricidae, the murex snails or rock snails.

== Species ==
Species within the genus Babelomurex include:

- Babelomurex armatus Sowerby III, 1912
- Babelomurex atlantidis Oliverio & Gofas, 2006
- Babelomurex backeljaui Thach, 2024
- Babelomurex basilium (Penna-Neme & Leme, 1978) (taxon inquirendum)
- Babelomurex bayeri Garrigues, D. Lamy & Zuccon, 2022
- Babelomurex benoiti (Tiberi, 1855)
- Babelomurex bernardi (K. Nicolay, 1984)
- Babelomurex blowi (Ladd, 1976)
- Babelomurex bozzettii Kosuge, 1994
- † Babelomurex brugnonei Appolloni & Smriglio, 2024
- Babelomurex capensis (Tomlin, 1928)
- Babelomurex cariniferoides (Shikama, T., 1966)
- Babelomurex cariniferus (G.B. Sowerby II, 1834)
- Babelomurex centimanus Kosuge, 1985
- Babelomurex colettae Garrigues, D. Lamy & Zuccon, 2022
- Babelomurex cookae Kosuge, 1988
- Babelomurex couturieri (Jousseaume, 1898)
- Babelomurex cristatus (Kosuge, 1979)
- Babelomurex dalli (Emerson & D'Attilio 1963)
- Babelomurex deburghiae (Reeve, 1857)
- † Babelomurex dellabellai (Brunetti, 2004)
- Babelomurex depressispiratus Oliverio, 2008
- Babelomurex deroyorum D'Attilio & Myers, 1984
- Babelomurex diadema (A. Adams, 1854)
- Babelomurex echinatus (Azuma, M., 1970)
- Babelomurex engae Thach, 2025
- Babelomurex fax (F. M. Bayer, 1971)
- Babelomurex filialis (Shikama, 1978)
- Babelomurex finchii (Fulton, H.C., 1930)
- Babelomurex fruticosus (Kosuge, 1979)
- Babelomurex gemmatus (Shikama, 1966)
- Babelomurex glaber Kosuge, 1998
- Babelomurex habui (Azuma, 1971)
- Babelomurex helenae (Azuma, 1973)
- Babelomurex hindsi (Carpenter, 1857)
- Babelomurex hirasei Shikama, 1964
- Babelomurex indicus (Smith, 1899)
- † Babelomurex janianus (Cocconi, 1873)
- Babelomurex japonicus (Dunker, R.W., 1882)
- Babelomurex jeanneae D'Attilio & B. W. Myers, 1984
- Babelomurex juliae (Clench & Aguayo, 1939)
- Babelomurex kawamurai (Kira, 1959): forms a complex
- Babelomurex kawanishii (Kosuge, 1979)
- Babelomurex kinoshitai (Fulton, 1930)
- † Babelomurex kissimeensis Petuch, 1991
- Babelomurex kuroharai (Habe, 1970)
- Babelomurex laevicostatus (Kosuge, 1981)
- Babelomurex latipinnatus (Azuma, 1961)
- Babelomurex lischkeanus (Dunker, R.W., 1882)
- Babelomurex longispinosus (Suzuki, 1972)
- Babelomurex macrocephalus Oliverio, 2008
- Babelomurex mansfieldi (McGinty, 1940)
- Babelomurex marumai Habe & Kosuge, 1970
- Babelomurex mediopacificus (Kosuge, 1979)
- Babelomurex meimiaoae S.-I Huang & Y.-F. Huang, 2019
- Babelomurex memimarumai Kosuge, 1985
- Babelomurex microspinosus Kosuge, 1988
- Babelomurex miyokoae Kosuge, 1985
- Babelomurex nagahorii (Kosuge, 1980)
- Babelomurex nakamigawai (Kuroda, 1959)
- Babelomurex nakayasui (Shikama, 1970)
- Babelomurex natalabies Oliverio, 2008
- Babelomurex neocaledonicus Kosuge & Oliverio, 2001
- Babelomurex oldroydi (I. S. Oldroyd, 1929)
- Babelomurex pacei (Petuch, 1987)
- Babelomurex pallox Oliverio, 2008
- Babelomurex pervernicosus (Suzuki, 1972)
- Babelomurex princeps (Melvill, 1912)
- Babelomurex problematicus (Kosuge, 1980)
- Babelomurex pruvosti Garrigues, D. Lamy & Zuccon, 2022
- Babelomurex purpuraterminus (Kosuge, 1979)
- Babelomurex purpuratus (Chenu, 1859)
- Babelomurex purus (Kosuge, 1985)
- Babelomurex ricinuloides (Schepman, 1911)
- Babelomurex rugosus Garrigues, D. Lamy & Zuccon, 2022
- Babelomurex scalariformis (Lamarck, 1822)
- Babelomurex sentix (Bayer, 1971)
- Babelomurex shingomarumai (Kosuge, 1981)
- Babelomurex spinaerosae (Shikama, 1970)
- Babelomurex spinosus Hirase, 1908
- Babelomurex squalidus Kosuge, 1985
- Babelomurex stenospinus (Kuroda, 1961)
- Babelomurex stupa Garrigues, D. Lamy & Zuccon, 2022
- Babelomurex takahashii (Kosuge, 1979)
- Babelomurex tectumsinense (Deshayes, 1856)
- Babelomurex tosanus (Hirase, 1908)
- Babelomurex tuberosus (Kosuge, 1980)
- Babelomurex tumidus (Kosuge, 1980)
- Babelomurex virginiae Kosuge & Oliverio, 2004
- Babelomurex wormaldi (Powell, 1971)
- Babelomurex yamatoensis Kosuge, 1986
- Babelomurex yumimarumai Kosuge, 1985

Species brought into synonymy

- Babelomurex asper (A. Adams, 1855): synonym of Coralliophila aspera (A. Adams, 1855)
- Babelomurex fearnleyi (Emerson, W.K. & A. d' Attilio, 1965): synonym of Coralliophila fearnleyi (Emerson & D'Attilio, 1965)
- Babelomurex fusiformis (Martens, 1902): synonym of Mipus fusiformis (Martens, 1902)
- Babelomurex gili Kosuge, 1990: synonym of Babelomurex tectumsinensis (Deshayes, 1856)
- Babelomurex multispinosus Shikama, 1966: synonym of Babelomurex spinosus (Hirase, 1908)
- Babelomurex multispinosa Shikama 1966: synonym of Babelomurex spinosus (Hirase, 1908)
- Babelomurex pagodus (A. Adams, 1853) sensu Hirase, 1934: synonym of Babelomurex spinosus (Y. Hirase, 1908) synonym of Babelomurex jeanneae D'Attilio & B. W. Myers, 1984 (misapplication)
- Babelomurex perfectus (P. Fischer, 1883): synonym of Coralliophila squamosa (Bivona e Bernardi, 1838)
- Babelomurex spinosus (Y. Hirase, 1908): synonym of Babelomurex jeanneae D'Attilio & B. W. Myers, 1984
- Babelomurex tectumsinensis [sic]: synonym of Babelomurex tectumsinense (Deshayes, 1856) (misspelling - incorrect subsequent spelling, specific name is a noun, therefore invariable)
