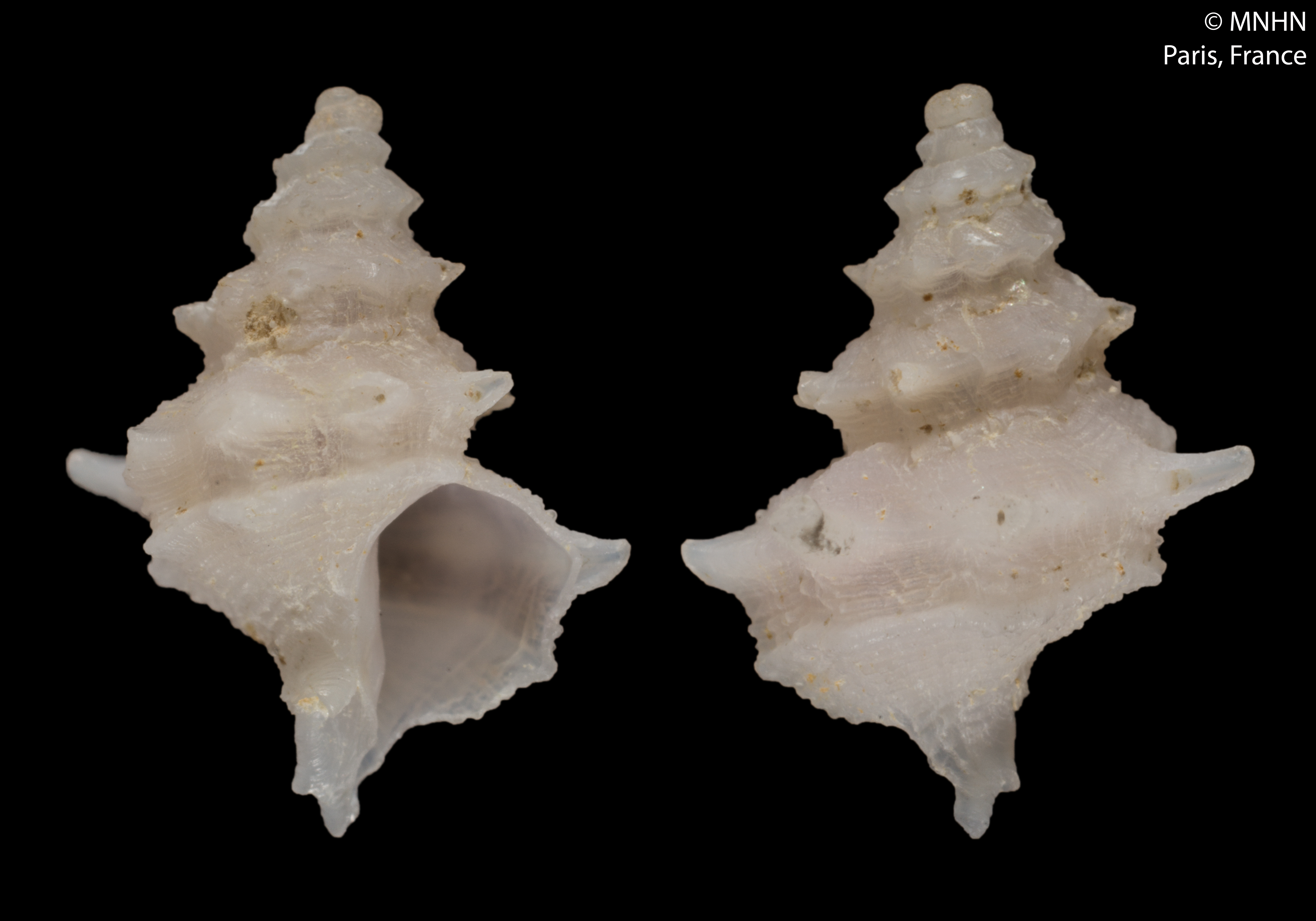
- Shell of Babelomurex macrocephalus (holotype at MNHN, Paris)

Scientific classification
- Kingdom: Animalia
- Phylum: Mollusca
- Class: Gastropoda
- Subclass: Caenogastropoda
- Order: Neogastropoda
- Family: Muricidae
- Genus: Babelomurex
- Species: B. macrocephalus

Binomial name
- Babelomurex macrocephalus Oliverio, 2008

= Babelomurex macrocephalus =

Species of gastropod

Babelomurex macrocephalus is a species of sea snail, a marine gastropod mollusc in the family Muricidae, the murex snails or rock snails.

== Distribution ==
The holotype of this marine species was found off Southern New Caledonia.
