= Babelomurex kawanishii =

Scientific classification
- Kingdom: Animalia
- Phylum: Mollusca
- Class: Gastropoda
- Subclass: Caenogastropoda
- Order: Neogastropoda
- Superfamily: Muricoidea
- Family: Muricidae
- Subfamily: Coralliophilinae
- Genus: Babelomurex
- Species: B. kawanishii

Binomial name
- Babelomurex kawanishii (Kosuge, 1979)

Synonyms
- Latiaxis (Echinolatiaxis) kawanishii Kosuge, 1979; Latiaxis kawanishii Kosuge, 1979

Species of gastropod

Babelomurex kawanishii is a species of sea snail, a marine gastropod mollusk, in the family Muricidae, the murex snails or rock snails.

== Distribution ==
This marine species occurs off Japan, the Philippines and New Caledonia.
