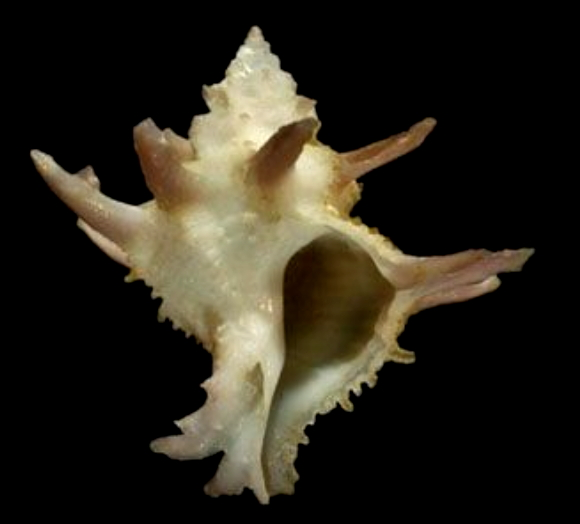
- Shell of Babelomurex spinaerosae (specimen at Natural History Museum, Rotterdam)

Scientific classification
- Kingdom: Animalia
- Phylum: Mollusca
- Class: Gastropoda
- Subclass: Caenogastropoda
- Order: Neogastropoda
- Superfamily: Muricoidea
- Family: Muricidae
- Subfamily: Coralliophilinae
- Genus: Babelomurex
- Species: B. spinaerosae

Binomial name
- Babelomurex spinaerosae (Shikama, 1970)

Synonyms
- Latiaxis (Babelomurex) spinaerosae Shikama, 1970 ·

= Babelomurex spinaerosae =

Species of gastropod

Babelomurex spinaerosae is a species of sea snail, a marine gastropod mollusk, in the family Muricidae, the murex snails or rock snails.

== Description ==
The length of the shell attains 20.4 mm, its diameter is 21.8 mm.

== Distribution ==
This marine species occurs off Japan and the Philippines.
