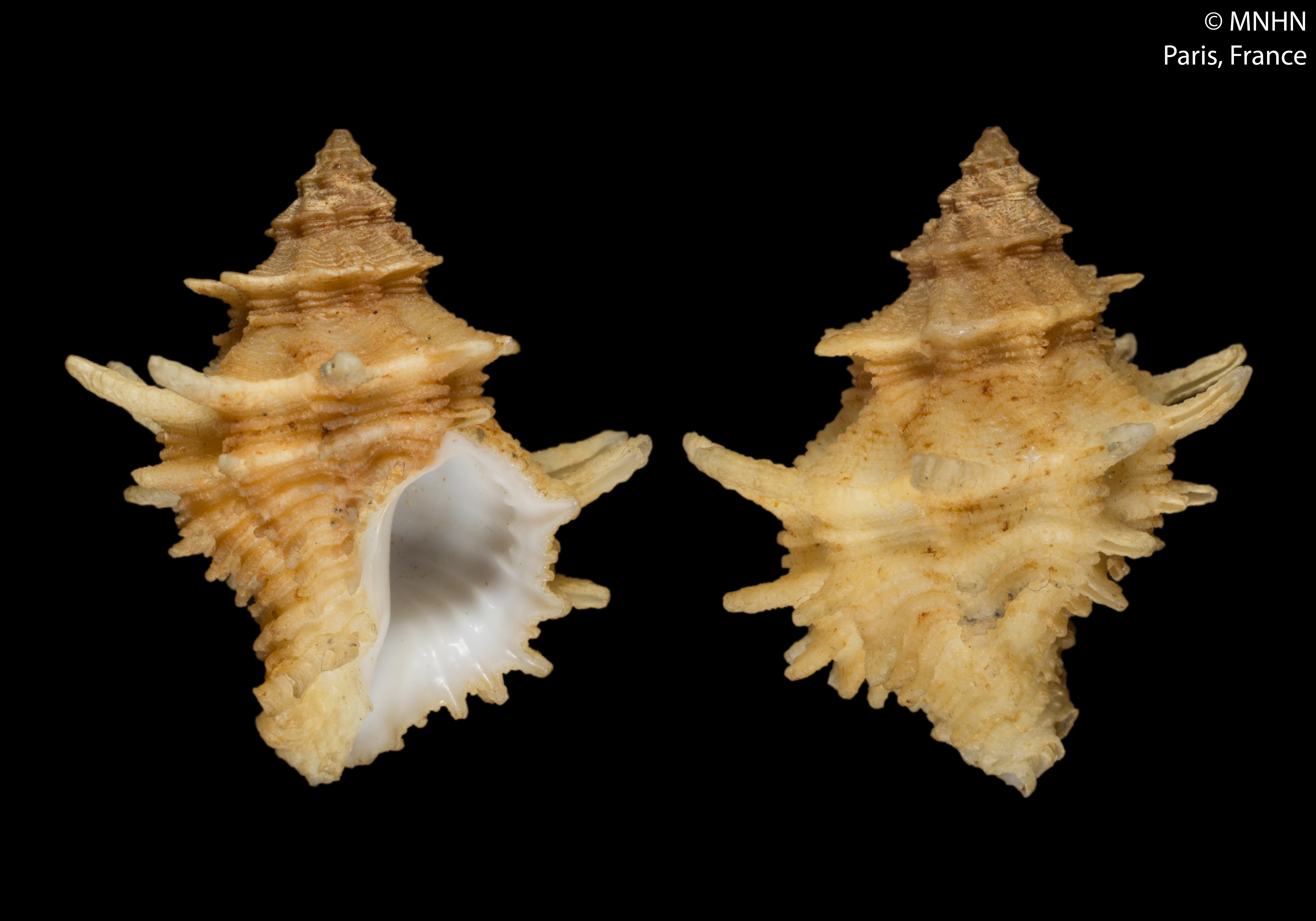
- Babelomurex bernardi shell

Scientific classification
- Kingdom: Animalia
- Phylum: Mollusca
- Class: Gastropoda
- Subclass: Caenogastropoda
- Order: Neogastropoda
- Superfamily: Muricoidea
- Family: Muricidae
- Subfamily: Coralliophilinae
- Genus: Babelomurex
- Species: B. bernardi

Binomial name
- Babelomurex bernardi (K. Nicolay, 1984)

Synonyms
- Latiaxis bernardi K. Nicolay, 1984

= Babelomurex bernardi =

Species of gastropod

Babelomurex bernardi is a species of sea snail, a marine gastropod mollusk, in the family Muricidae, the murex snails or rock snails.

== Description ==
The length of the shell attains 27 mm.

== Distribution ==
The holotype of this marine species was found off Gabon.
