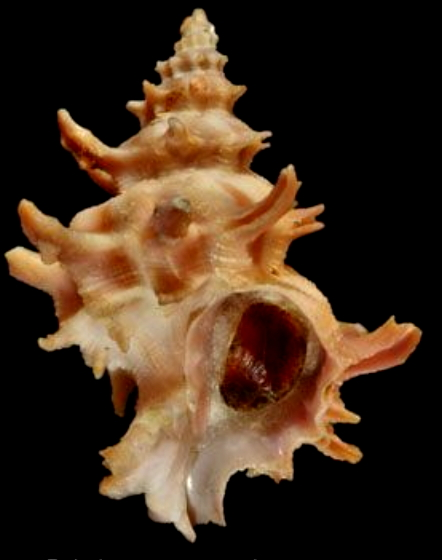
- Shell of Babelomurex pervernicosus (specimen at the Natural History Museum, Rotterdam)

Scientific classification
- Kingdom: Animalia
- Phylum: Mollusca
- Class: Gastropoda
- Subclass: Caenogastropoda
- Order: Neogastropoda
- Superfamily: Muricoidea
- Family: Muricidae
- Subfamily: Coralliophilinae
- Genus: Babelomurex
- Species: B. pervernicosus

Binomial name
- Babelomurex pervernicosus (Suzuki, 1972)

Synonyms
- Latiaxis pervernicosus M. Suzuki, 1972 ·

= Babelomurex pervernicosus =

Species of gastropod

Babelomurex pervernicosus is a species of sea snail, a marine gastropod mollusk, in the family Muricidae, the murex snails or rock snails.

== Description ==
The length of the shell attains 32 mm.

Species consumes sessile prey

== Distribution ==
This marine species occurs off Japan and in the East China Sea.
