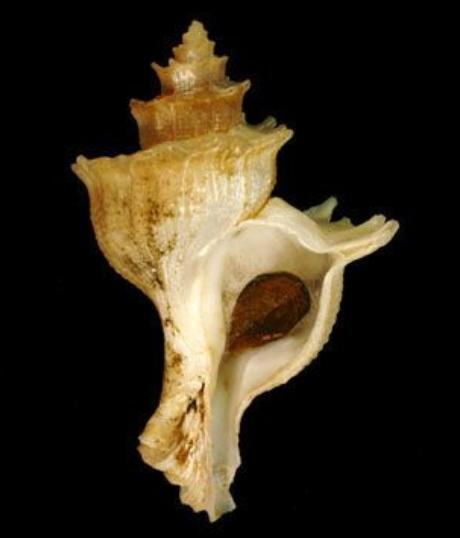
- Shell of Babelomurex helenae (specimen at the Natural History Museum, Rotterdam)

Scientific classification
- Kingdom: Animalia
- Phylum: Mollusca
- Class: Gastropoda
- Subclass: Caenogastropoda
- Order: Neogastropoda
- Superfamily: Muricoidea
- Family: Muricidae
- Subfamily: Coralliophilinae
- Genus: Babelomurex
- Species: B. helenae

Binomial name
- Babelomurex helenae (Azuma, 1973)

Synonyms
- Babelomurex kawamurai helenae (Azuma, 1973); Latiaxis (Babelomurex) kawamurai helenae Azuma, 1973; Latiaxis (Babelomurex) nakamigawai io Kilburn, 1974; Latiaxis helenae Azuma, 1973; Latiaxis kawamurai helenae Azuma, 1973; Latiaxis nakamigawai io Kilburn, 1974

= Babelomurex helenae =

Species of gastropod

Babelomurex helenae is a species of sea snail, a marine gastropod mollusk, in the family Muricidae, the murex snails or rock snails.

== Description ==
The length of the shell of the holotype attains 65 mm, its diameter 42 mm.

== Distribution ==
This marine species occurs in the South Mozambique Channel and off South Africa.
