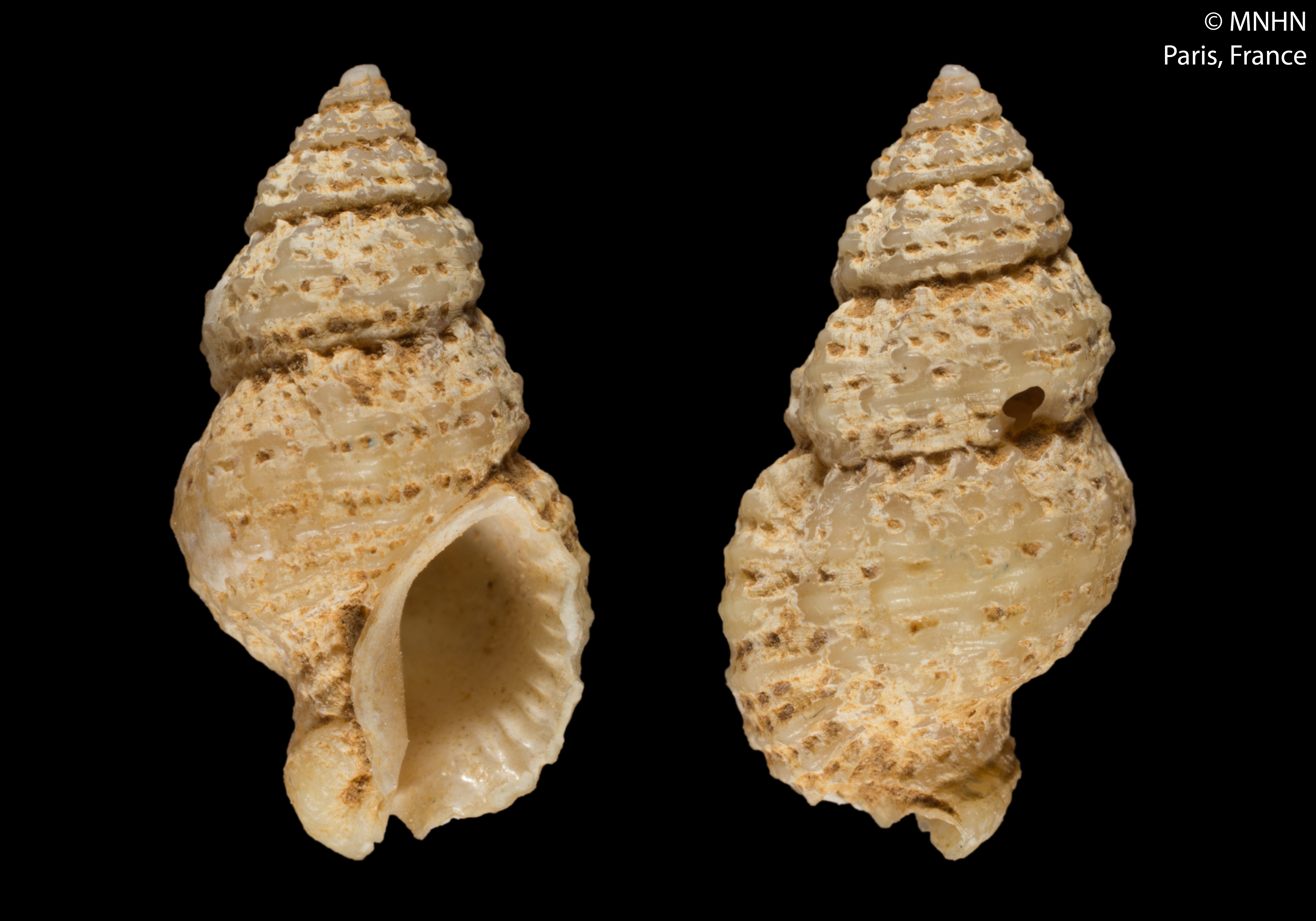
- Ingensia ingens

Scientific classification
- Kingdom: Animalia
- Phylum: Mollusca
- Class: Gastropoda
- Subclass: Caenogastropoda
- Order: Neogastropoda
- Superfamily: Muricoidea
- Family: Muricidae
- Subfamily: Aspellinae
- Genus: Ingensia; Houart, 2001

Type species
- Maculotriton ingens Houart, 1987

Species
- See text

= Ingensia =

Genus of gastropods

Ingensia is a genus of sea snails, marine gastropod mollusks in the family Muricidae, the murex snails or rock snails.

== Species ==
Species within the genus Ingensia include:

- Ingensia brithys Houart, 2001
- Ingensia ingens (Houart, 1987)

Species brought into synonymy

- Ingensia anomalus (Dell, 1956): synonym of Terefundus anomalus Dell, 1956
- Ingensia axirugosus (Dell, 1956): synonym of Terefundus axirugosus Dell, 1956
