= Terefundus cuvierensis =

Scientific classification
- Kingdom: Animalia
- Phylum: Mollusca
- Class: Gastropoda
- Subclass: Caenogastropoda
- Order: Neogastropoda
- Family: Muricidae
- Genus: Terefundus
- Species: T. cuvierensis

Binomial name
- Terefundus cuvierensis (Mestayer, 1919)

Synonyms
- Leucosyrinx cuvierensis Mestayer, 1919

Species of gastropod

Terefundus cuvierensis is a species of sea snail, a marine gastropod mollusk in the family Muricidae, the murex snails or rock snails.
