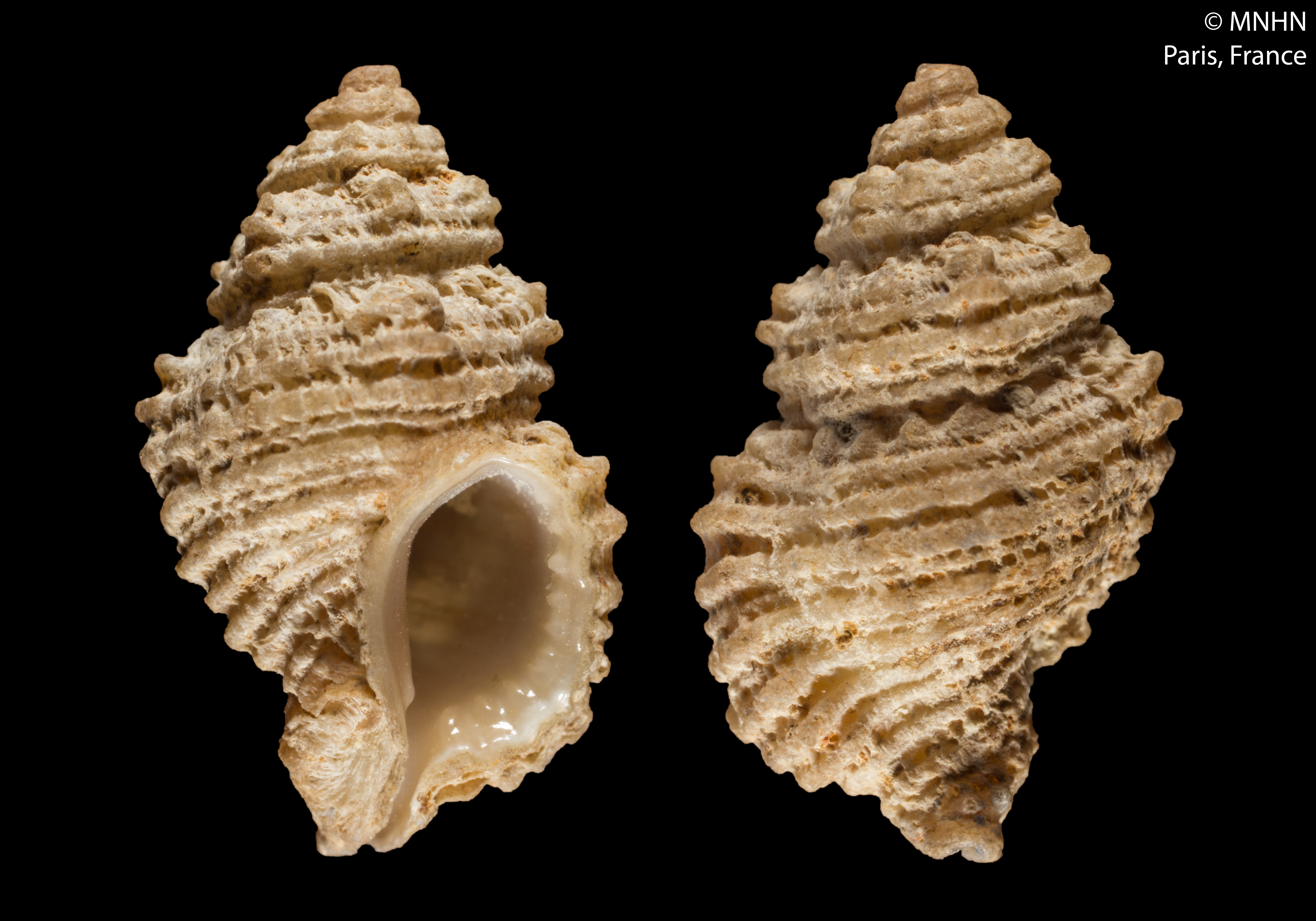

Scientific classification
- Kingdom: Animalia
- Phylum: Mollusca
- Class: Gastropoda
- Subclass: Caenogastropoda
- Order: Neogastropoda
- Family: Muricidae
- Genus: Ingensia
- Species: I. brithys

Binomial name
- Ingensia brithys Houart, 2001

= Ingensia brithys =

Species of gastropod

Ingensia brithys is a species of sea snail, a marine gastropod mollusc in the family Muricidae, the murex snails or rock snails.
