= Terefundus quadricinctus =

Scientific classification
- Kingdom: Animalia
- Phylum: Mollusca
- Class: Gastropoda
- Subclass: Caenogastropoda
- Order: Neogastropoda
- Family: Muricidae
- Genus: Terefundus
- Species: T. quadricinctus

Binomial name
- Terefundus quadricinctus (Suter, 1908)

Synonyms
- Mangilia quadricinctus Suter, 1908; Terefundus (Terefundus) quadricinctus (Suter, 1908) · accepted, alternate representation; Terefundus (Terefundus) quadricinctus quadricinctus (Suter, 1908) · accepted, alternate representation

Species of gastropod

Terefundus quadricinctus is a species of sea snail, a marine gastropod mollusk in the family Muricidae, the murex snails or rock snails.

== Distribution ==
This marine species is endemic to New Zealand.
