= Terefundus unicarinatus =

Scientific classification
- Kingdom: Animalia
- Phylum: Mollusca
- Class: Gastropoda
- Subclass: Caenogastropoda
- Order: Neogastropoda
- Family: Muricidae
- Genus: Terefundus
- Species: T. unicarinatus

Binomial name
- Terefundus unicarinatus Dell, 1956

Synonyms
- Terefundus quadricinctus unicarinatus Dell, 1956

Species of gastropod

Terefundus unicarinatus is a species of sea snail, a marine gastropod mollusc in the family Muricidae, the murex snails or rock snails.

== Distribution ==
This marine species is endemic to New Zealand.
