= Terefundus =

Scientific classification
- Kingdom: Animalia
- Phylum: Mollusca
- Class: Gastropoda
- Subclass: Caenogastropoda
- Order: Neogastropoda
- Family: Muricidae
- Subfamily: Pagodulinae
- Genus: Terefundus; Finlay, 1926

Type species
- Trophon crispulatus Suter, 1908

Synonyms
- Terefundus (Terefundus) Finlay, 1926 · accepted, alternate representation

Genus of gastropods

Terefundus is a genus of sea snails, marine gastropod mollusks in the family Muricidae, the murex snails or rock snails.

== Species ==
Species within the genus Terefundus include:

- Terefundus anomalus Dell, 1956
- Terefundus axirugosus Dell, 1956
- Terefundus crispulatus (Suter, 1908)
- Terefundus cuvierensis (Mestayer, 1919)
- †Terefundus lamelliferus P. A. Maxwell, 1988
- † Terefundus murdochi (Marwick, 1924)
- Terefundus quadricinctus (Suter, 1908)
- Terefundus unicarinatus Dell, 1956:

Species brought into synonymy

- Terefundus crassiliratus (Suter, 1908): synonym of Minortrophon crassiliratus (Suter, 1908)
