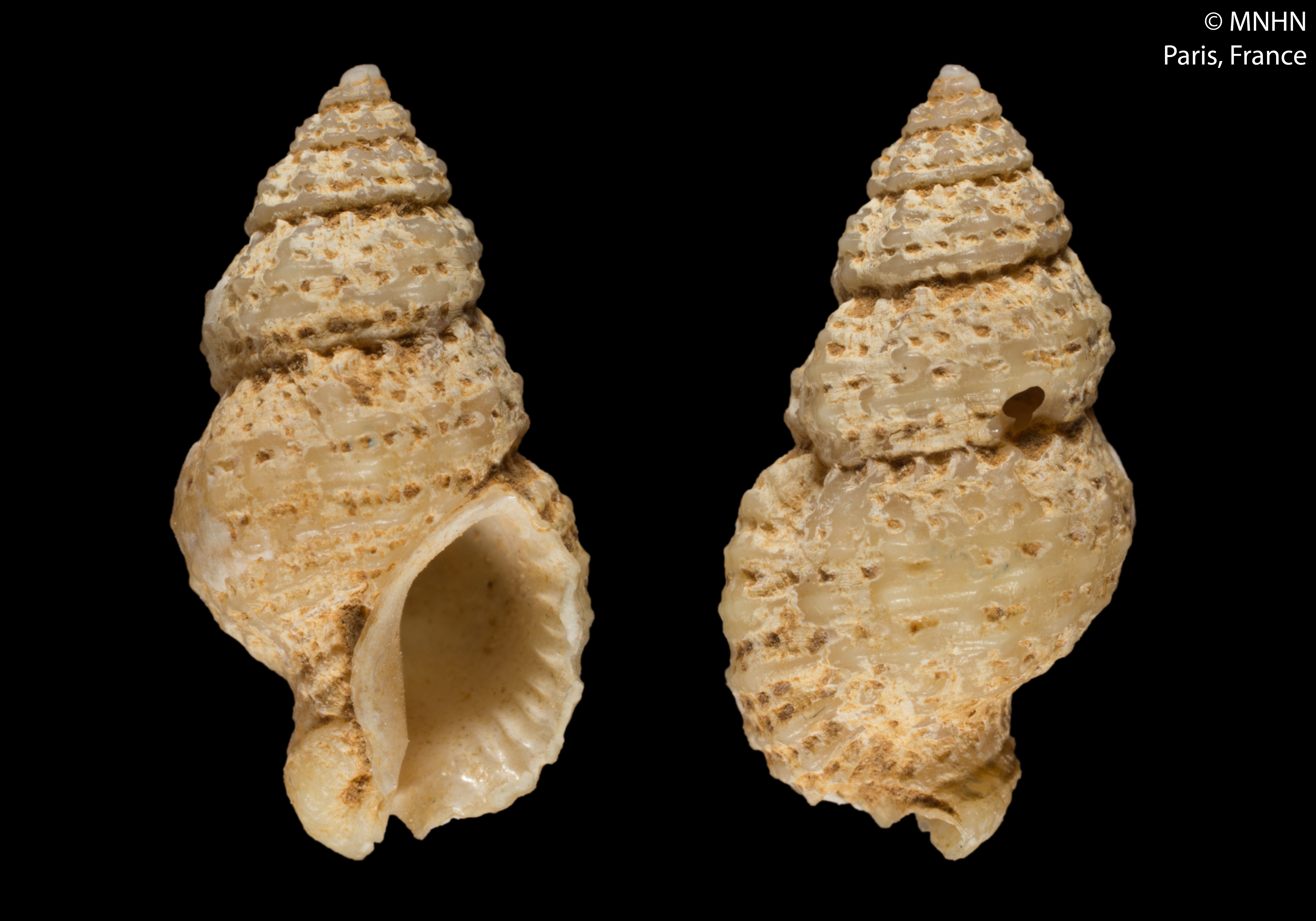

Scientific classification
- Kingdom: Animalia
- Phylum: Mollusca
- Class: Gastropoda
- Subclass: Caenogastropoda
- Order: Neogastropoda
- Family: Muricidae
- Genus: Ingensia
- Species: I. ingens

Binomial name
- Ingensia ingens (Houart, 1987)

Synonyms
- Maculotriton ingens Houart, 1987

= Ingensia ingens =

Species of gastropod

Ingensia ingens is a species of sea snail, a marine gastropod mollusc in the family Muricidae, the murex snails or rock snails.
