= Terefundus crispulatus =

Scientific classification
- Kingdom: Animalia
- Phylum: Mollusca
- Class: Gastropoda
- Subclass: Caenogastropoda
- Order: Neogastropoda
- Family: Muricidae
- Genus: Terefundus
- Species: T. crispulatus

Binomial name
- Terefundus crispulatus (Suter, 1908)

Synonyms
- Trophon (Trophonopsis) crispulatus Suter, 1908; Trophon crispulatus Suter, 1908

Species of gastropod

Terefundus crispulatus is a species of sea snail, a marine gastropod mollusk in the family Muricidae, the murex snails or rock snails.
