= Terefundus anomalus =

Scientific classification
- Kingdom: Animalia
- Phylum: Mollusca
- Class: Gastropoda
- Subclass: Caenogastropoda
- Order: Neogastropoda
- Family: Muricidae
- Genus: Terefundus
- Species: T. anomalus

Binomial name
- Terefundus anomalus Dell, 1956

Synonyms
- Ingensia anomalus Dell, 1956

Species of gastropod

Terefundus anomalus is a species of sea snail, a marine gastropod mollusk in the family Muricidae, the murex snails or rock snails.

== Description ==
The length of the shell reaches 3.6 mm.

== Distribution ==
This marine species occurs off Ninety Mile Beach, North Island, New Zealand
