= Terefundus axirugosus =

Scientific classification
- Kingdom: Animalia
- Phylum: Mollusca
- Class: Gastropoda
- Subclass: Caenogastropoda
- Order: Neogastropoda
- Family: Muricidae
- Genus: Terefundus
- Species: T. axirugosus

Binomial name
- Terefundus axirugosus Dell, 1956

Synonyms
- Ingensia axirugosus (Dell, 1956)

Species of gastropod

Terefundus axirugosus is a species of sea snail, a marine gastropod mollusk in the family Muricidae, the murex snails or rock snails.

This marine species occurs off New Zealand.
