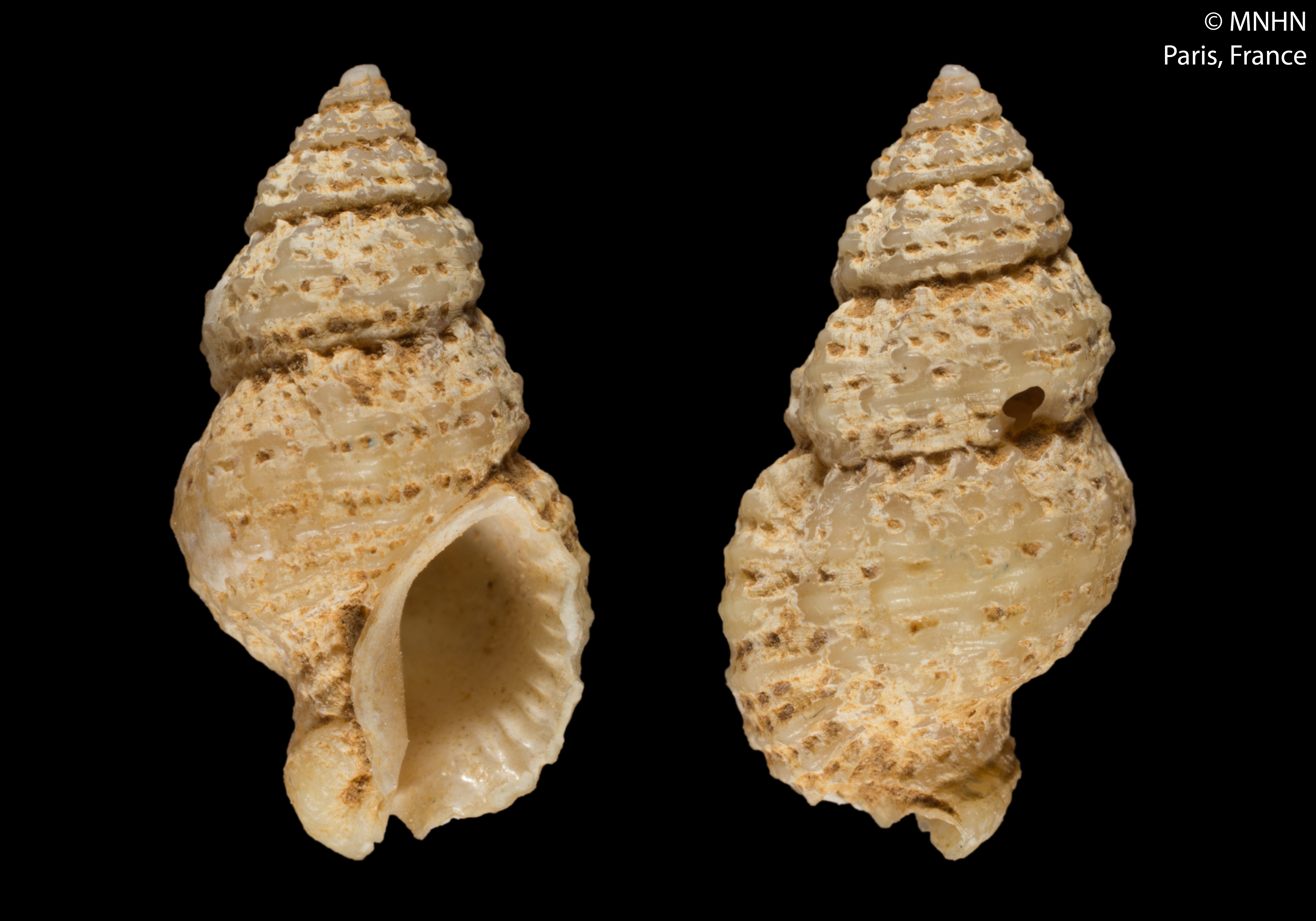
- Ingensia ingens

Scientific classification
- Kingdom: Animalia
- Phylum: Mollusca
- Class: Gastropoda
- Subclass: Caenogastropoda
- Order: Neogastropoda
- Superfamily: Muricoidea
- Family: Muricidae
- Subfamily: Aspellinae; Keen, 1971

Genera
- See text

= Aspellinae =

Subfamily of gastropods

Aspellinae is a taxonomic subfamily of predatory sea snails, marine gastropod mollusks within the large family Muricidae, the murex snails and rock snails.

== Genera ==
This genera were previously included in the subfamily Muricinae. In 2017 they were brought into this new subfamily by the publication of the "Revised classification, nomenclator and typification of gastropod and monoplacophoran families." by Bouchet P., Rocroi J.P., Hausdorf B., Kaim A., Kano Y., Nützel A., Parkhaev P., Schrödl M. & Strong E.E.

- Aspella Mörch, 1877
- Attiliosa Emerson, 1968
- Dermomurex Monterosato, 1890
- Ingensia Houart, 2001

Genera brought into synonymy

- Poweria Monterosato, 1884: synonym of Dermomurex Monterosato, 1890 (invalid: junior homonym of Poweria Bonaparte, 1840 [Pisces]; Dermomurex is a replacement name)
- Takia Kuroda, 1953: synonym of Dermomurex (Takia) Kuroda, 1953 represented as Dermomurex Monterosato, 1890 (original rank)
- Trialatella Berry, 1964: synonym of Dermomurex (Trialatella) Berry, 1964 represented as Dermomurex Monterosato, 1890
