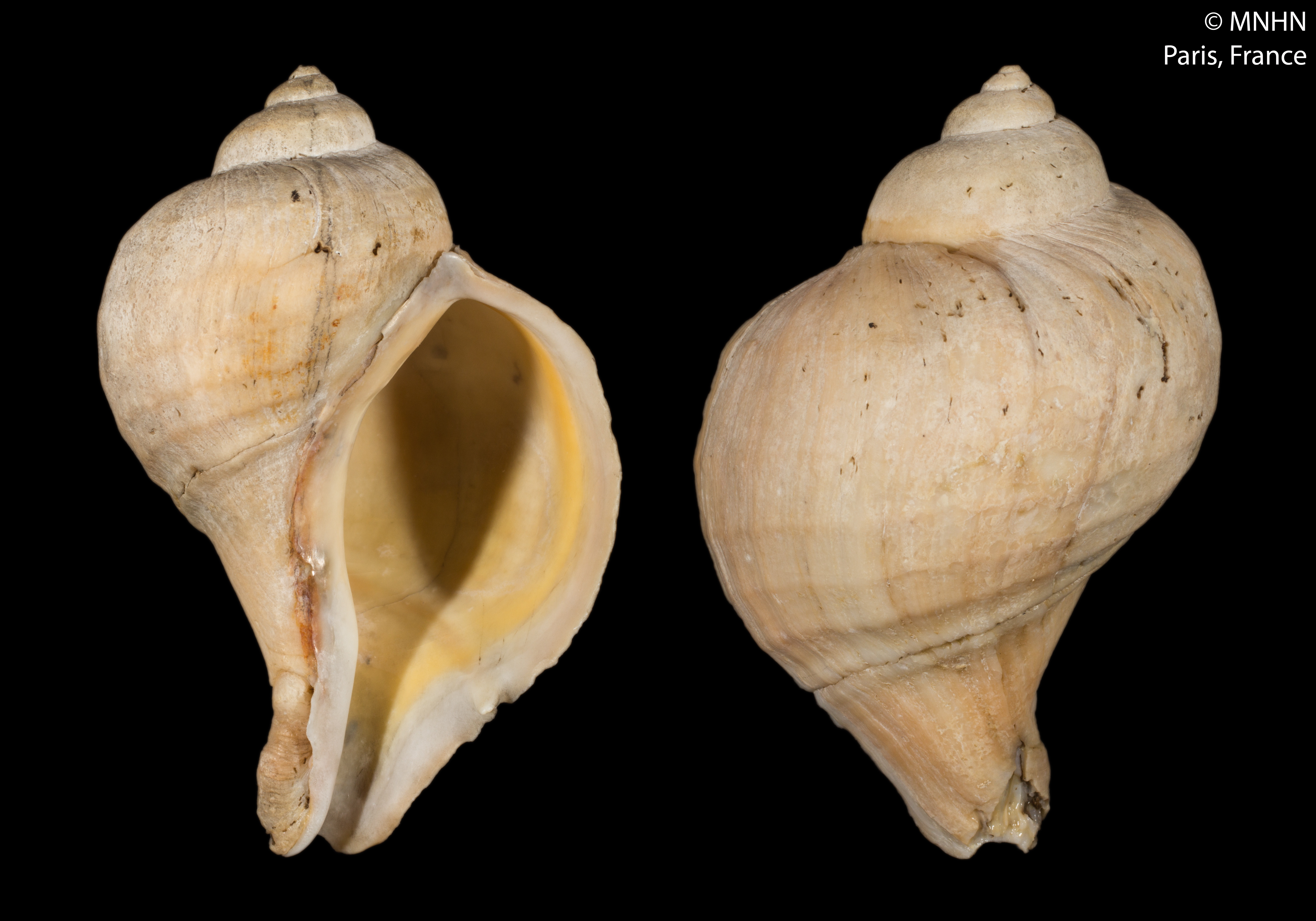
- Shell of Chorus giganteus

Scientific classification
- Kingdom: Animalia
- Phylum: Mollusca
- Class: Gastropoda
- Subclass: Caenogastropoda
- Order: Neogastropoda
- Superfamily: Muricoidea
- Family: Muricidae; Rafinesque, 1815

Subfamilies
- See text

= Muricidae =

Muricidae Temporal range: Aptian–recent

Family of molluscs

Muricidae is a large and varied taxonomic family of small to large predatory sea snails, marine gastropod mollusks, commonly known as murex snails or rock snails. With over 1,700 living species, the Muricidae represent almost 10% of the Neogastropoda. Additionally, 1,200 fossil species have been recognized. Numerous subfamilies are recognized, although experts disagree about the subfamily divisions and the definitions of the genera. Many muricids have unusual shells which are considered attractive by shell collectors and by interior designers.

== Shell description ==
Muricid shells are variably shaped, generally with a raised spire and strong sculpture with spiral ridges and often axial varices (typically three or more varices on each whorl), also frequently bearing spines, tubercles, or blade-like processes. Periostracum is absent in this family. The aperture is variable in shape; it may be ovate to more or less contracted, with a well-marked anterior siphonal canal that may be very long. The shell's outer lip is often denticulated inside, sometimes with a tooth-like process on its margin. The columella is smoothish to weakly ridged. The operculum is corneous and of variable thickness, with the nucleus near the anterior end or at about midlength of the outer margin.

Many muricids have episodic growth, which means their shells grow in spurts, remaining the same size for a while (during which time the varix develops) before rapidly growing to the next size stage. The result is the series of above mentioned varices on each whorl.

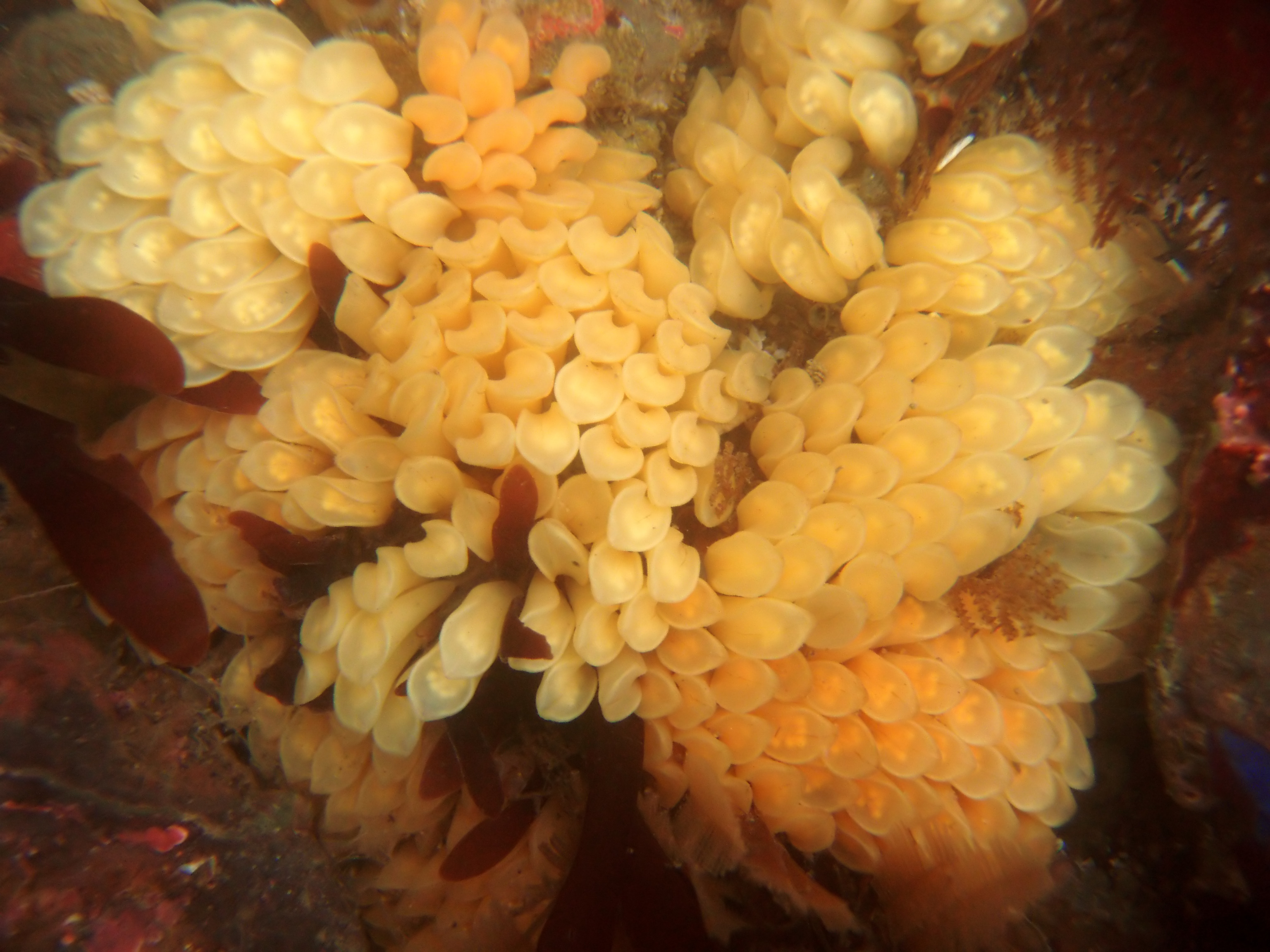
A mass of muricid egg capsules in a tidepool in Central California

== Life habits ==
Most species of muricids are carnivorous, active predators that feed on other gastropods, bivalves, and barnacles. The access to the soft parts of the prey is typically obtained by boring a hole through the shell by means of a softening secretion and the scraping action of the radula. Because of their carnivory, some species may be considered pests because they can cause considerable destruction both in exploited natural beds of bivalves, and in farmed areas of commercial bivalves.

Muricids lay eggs in protective, corneous capsules, the size and shape of which vary by species. From these capsules the crawling juveniles, or more rarely planktonic larvae, hatch.

== Historical value ==
Members of the family were harvested by early Mediterranean peoples, with the Phoenicians possibly the first to do so, to extract an expensive, vivid, stable dye known as Tyrian purple, imperial purple, or royal purple.

== The fossil record ==
The family Muricidae first appears in the fossil record during the Aptian age of the Cretaceous period.

== Subfamilies ==
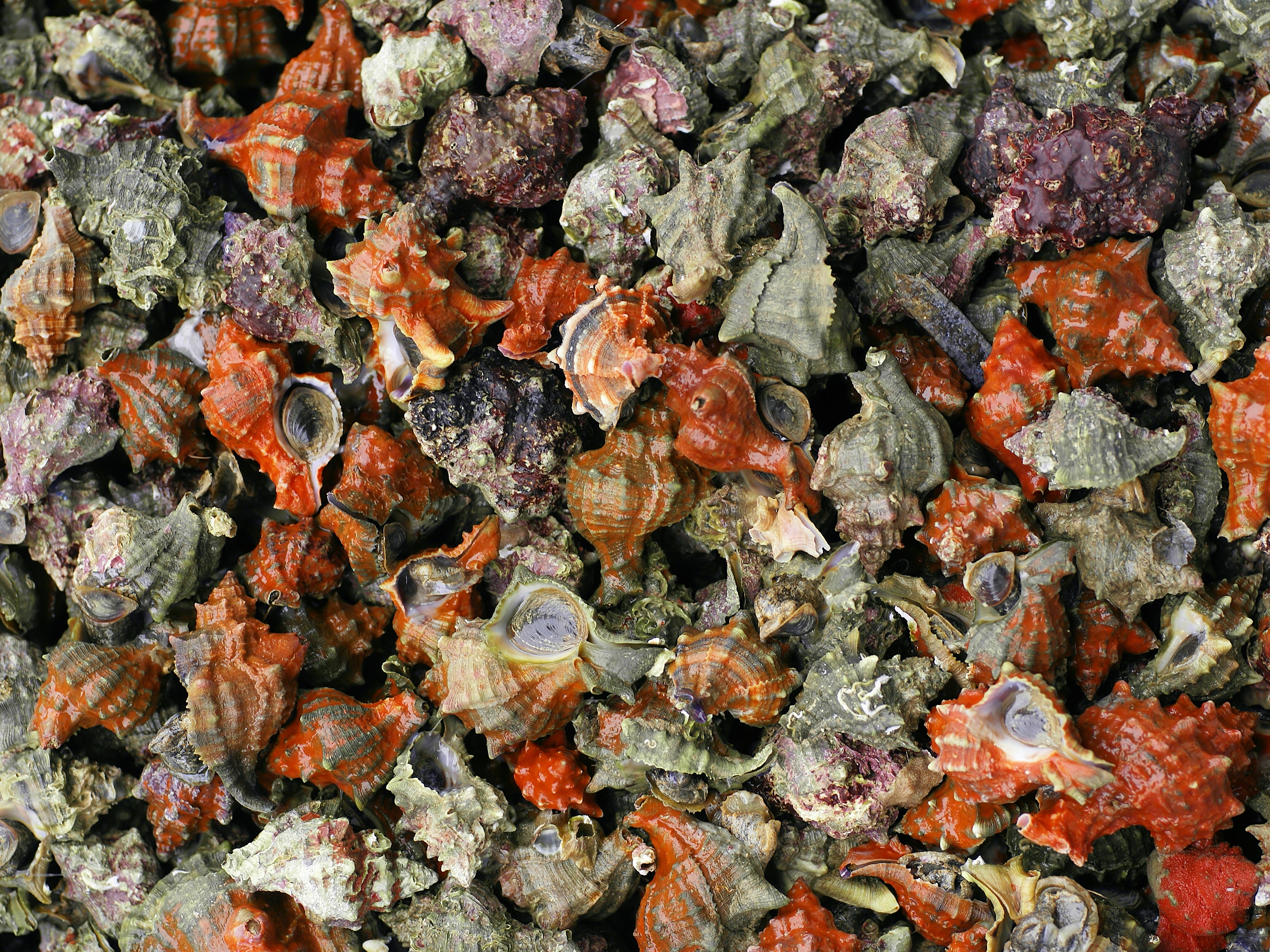
Numerous Hexaplex trunculus for sale in a fishmarket in Spain

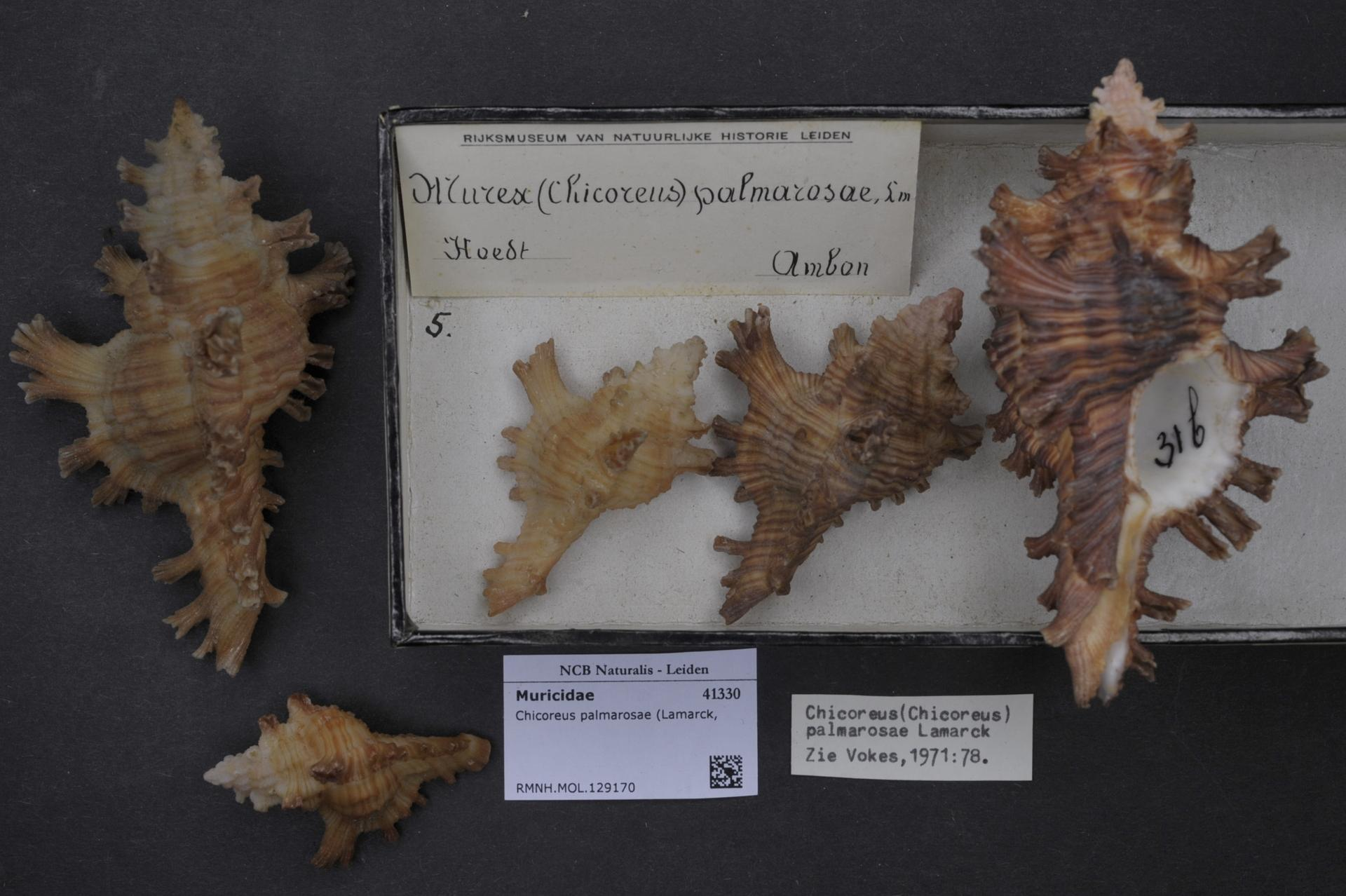
Museum specimens of Chicoreus palmarosae (Lamarck, 1822), Naturalis

According to the taxonomy of the Gastropoda by Bouchet & Rocroi (2005) the family Muricidae consists of these subfamilies:

- Aspellinae Keen, 1971
- Coralliophilinae Chenu, 1859 - synonym: Magilidae Thiele, 1925
- Ergalataxinae Kuroda, Habe & Oyama, 1971
- Haustrinae Tan, 2003
- Muricinae Rafinesque, 1815
- Muricopsinae Radwin & d'Attilio, 1971: synonym of Aspellinae Keen, 1971 ( junior subjective synonym)
- Ocenebrinae Cossmann, 1903
- Pagodulinae Barco, Schiaparelli, Houart & Oliverio, 2012
- Rapaninae Gray, 1853 - synonym: Thaididae Jousseaume, 1888
- Tripterotyphinae d'Attilio & Hertz, 1988: synonym of Muricopsinae Radwin & D'Attilio, 1971 : synonym of Aspellinae Keen, 1971 (junior subjective synonym)
- Trophoninae Cossmann, 1903: synonym of Ocenebrinae Cossmann, 1903 (junior subjective synonym)
- Typhinae Cossmann, 1903
- [unassigned] Muricidae

Synonyms

- Subfamily Drupinae Wenz, 1938: synonym of Rapaninae Gray, 1853
- Genus Drupinia [sic]: synonym of Drupina Dall, 1923
- Genus Galeropsis Hupé, 1860: synonym of Coralliophila H. Adams & A. Adams, 1853
- Tritoninae Gray, 1847: synonym of Ranellidae Gray, 1854 (Invalid: type genus placed on the Official Index by Opinion 886 [junior homonym of Triton Linnaeus, 1758])
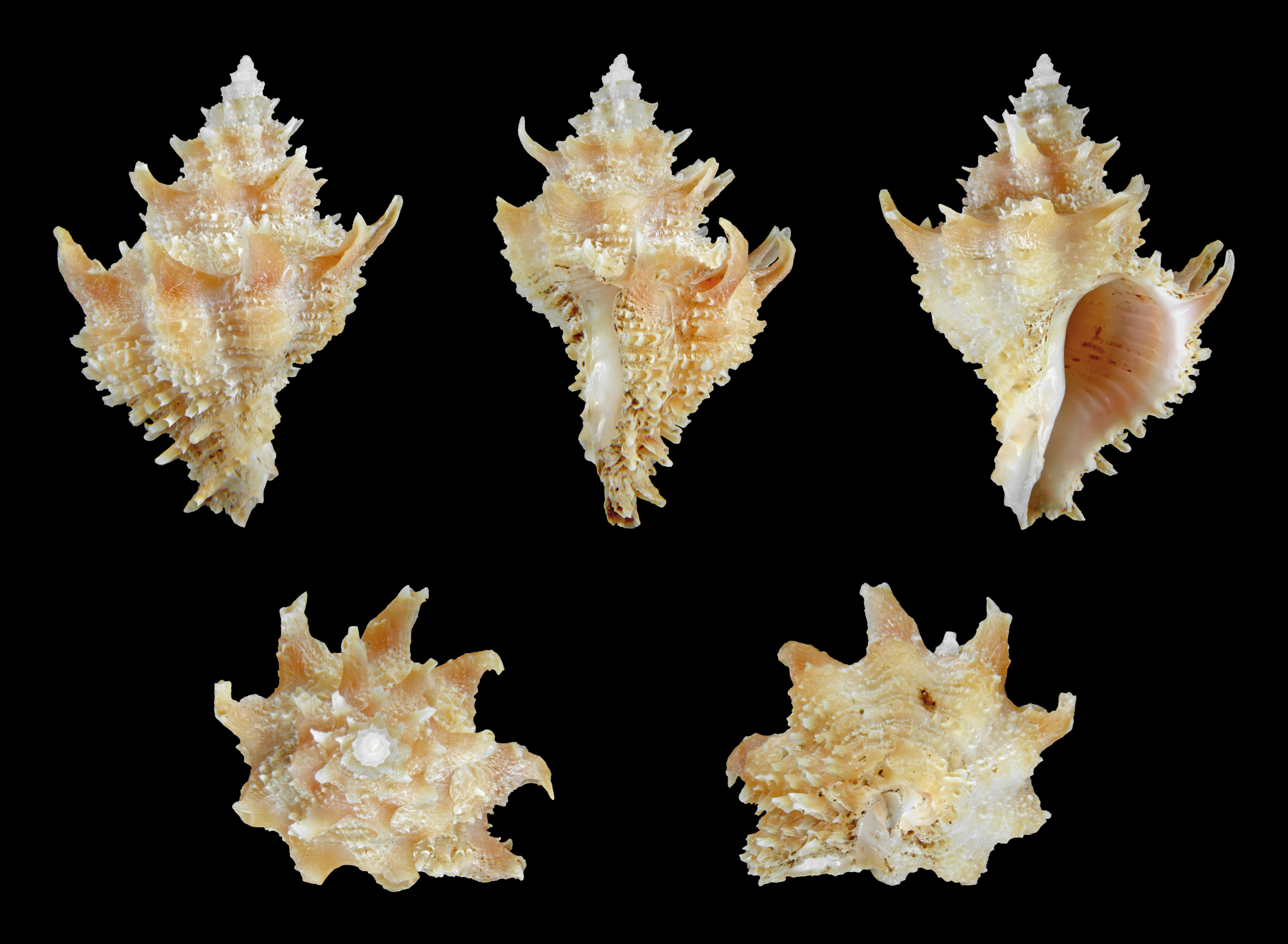
Babelomurex nagahorii

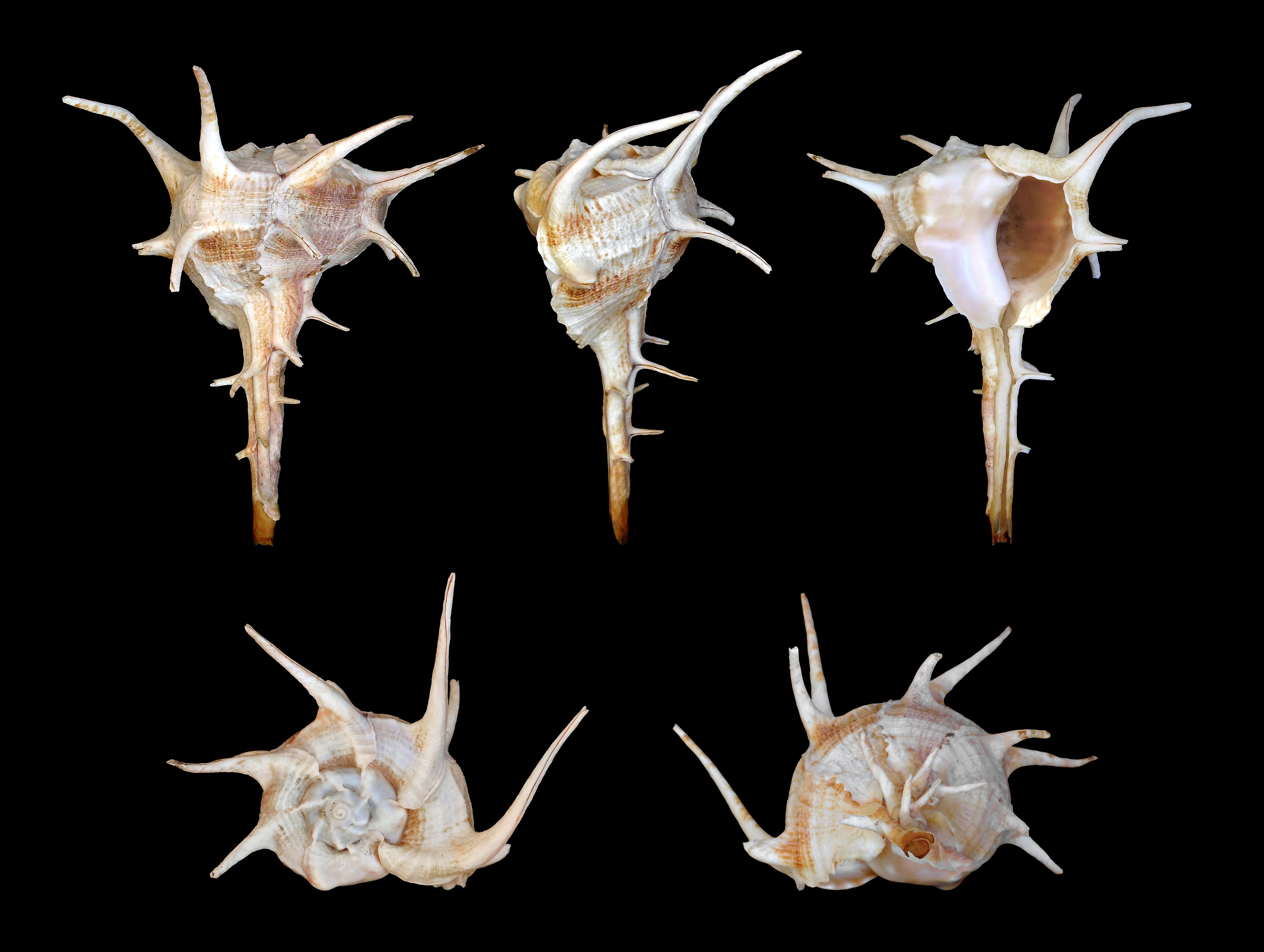
Bolinus cornutus

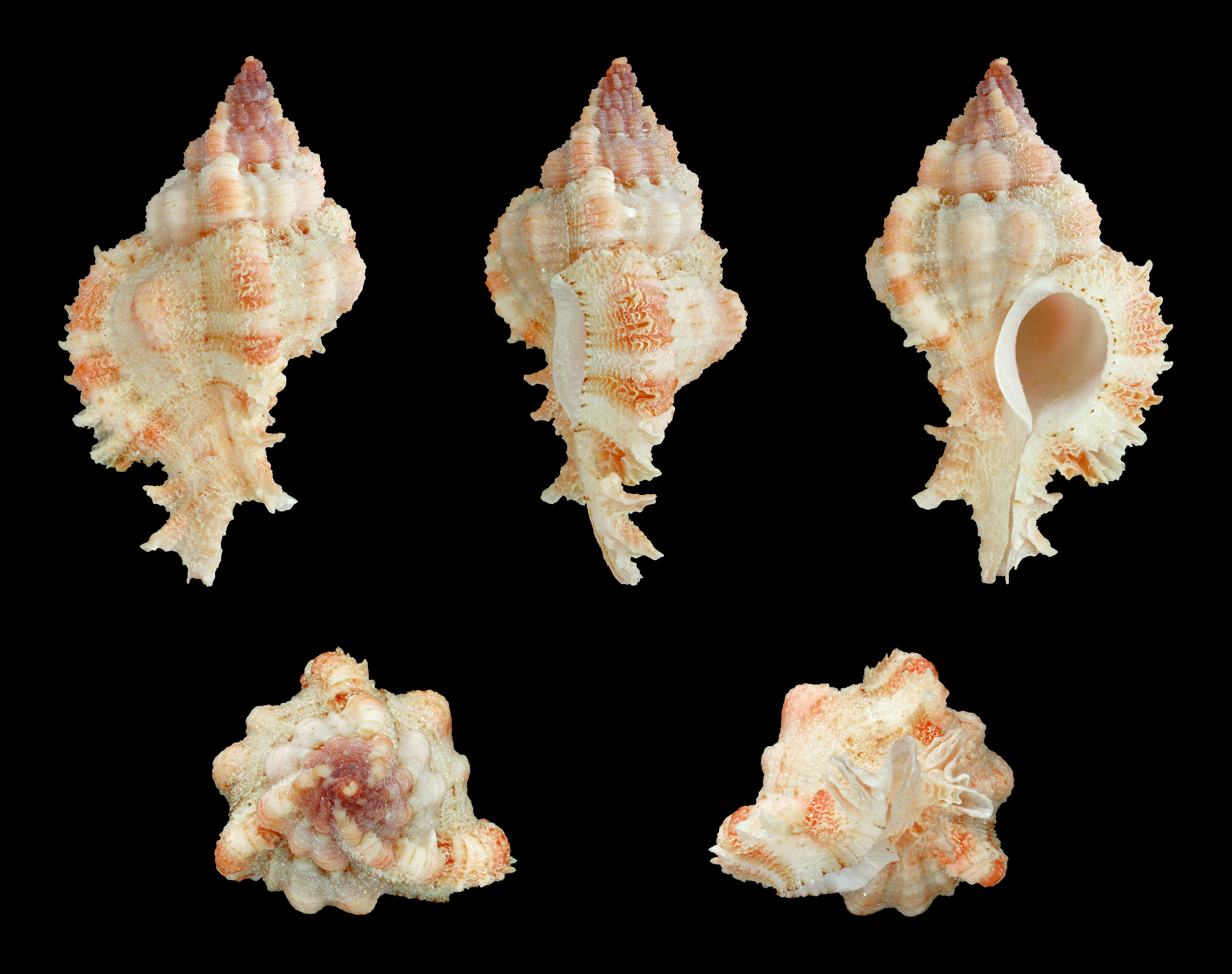
Chicomurex venustulus

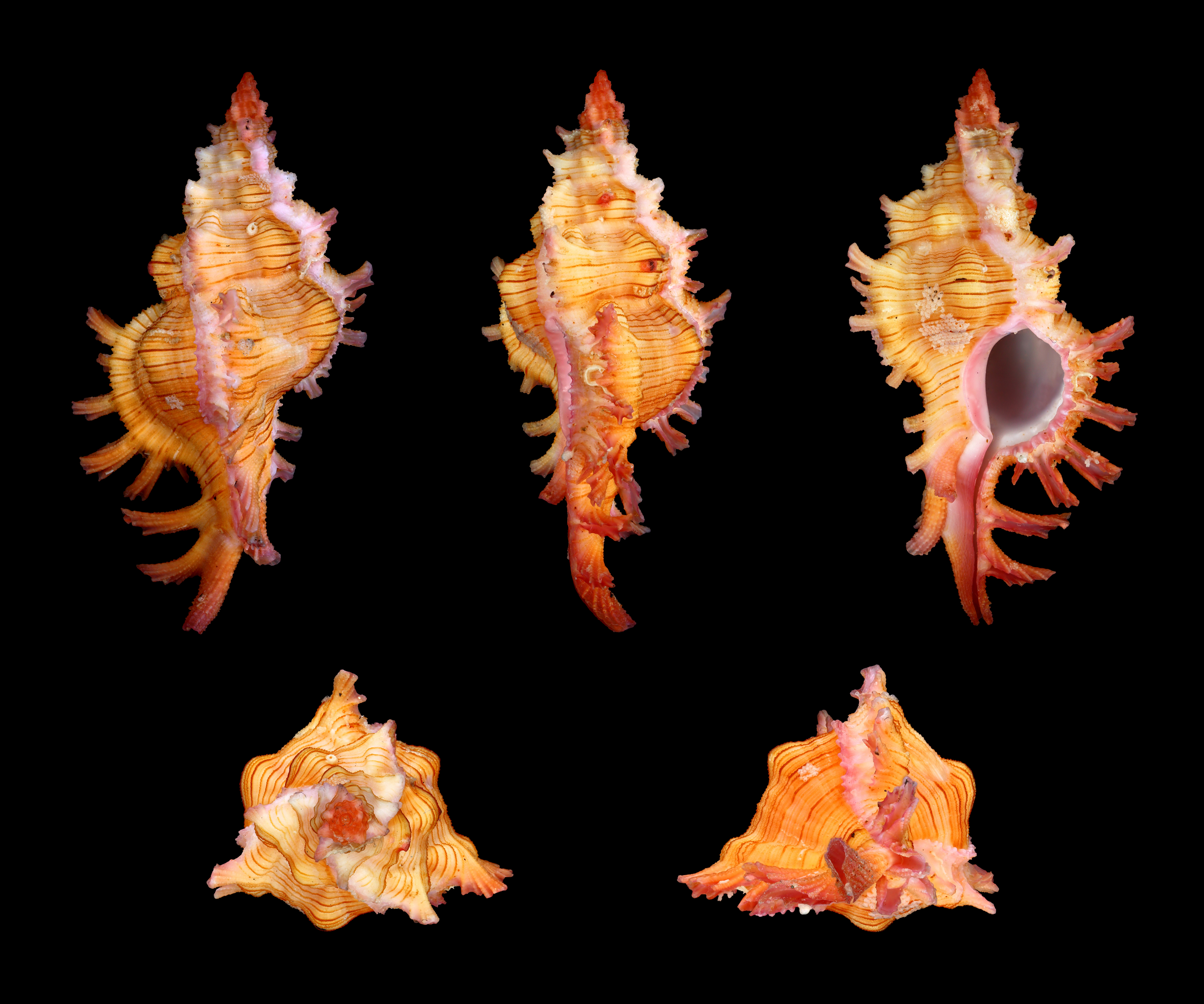
Chicoreus aculeatus

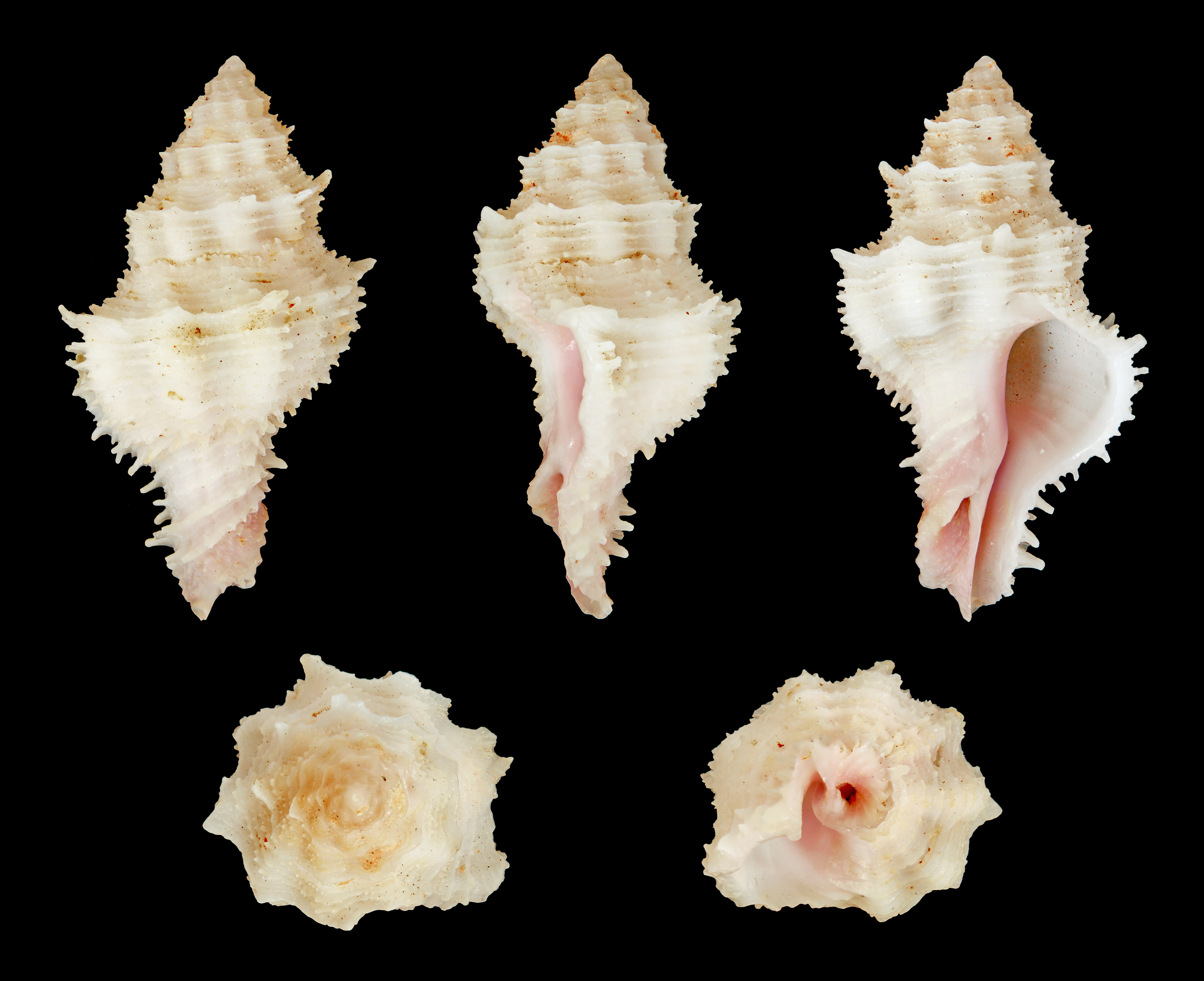
Coralliophila fearnleyi

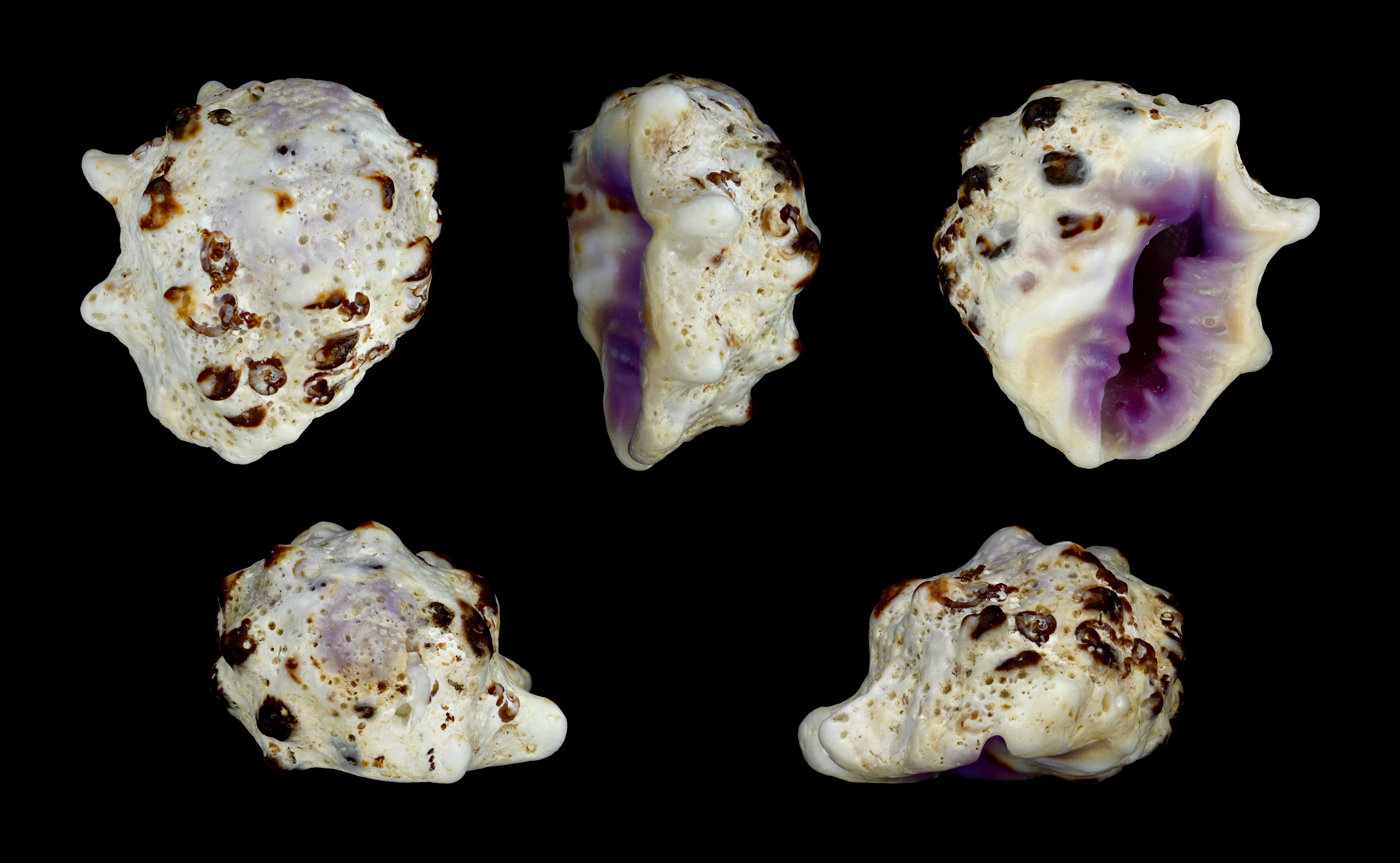
Drupa morum

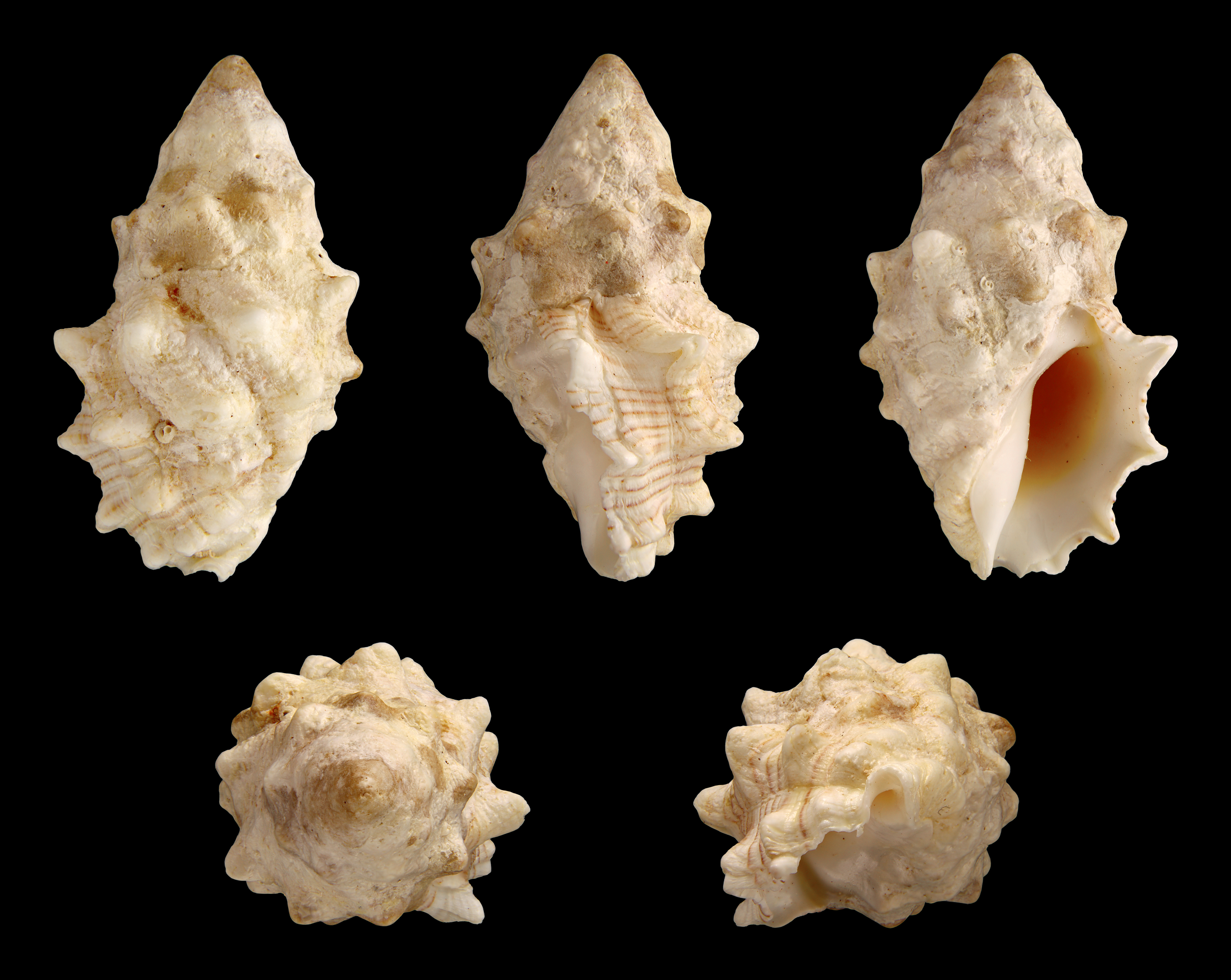
Drupella cornus

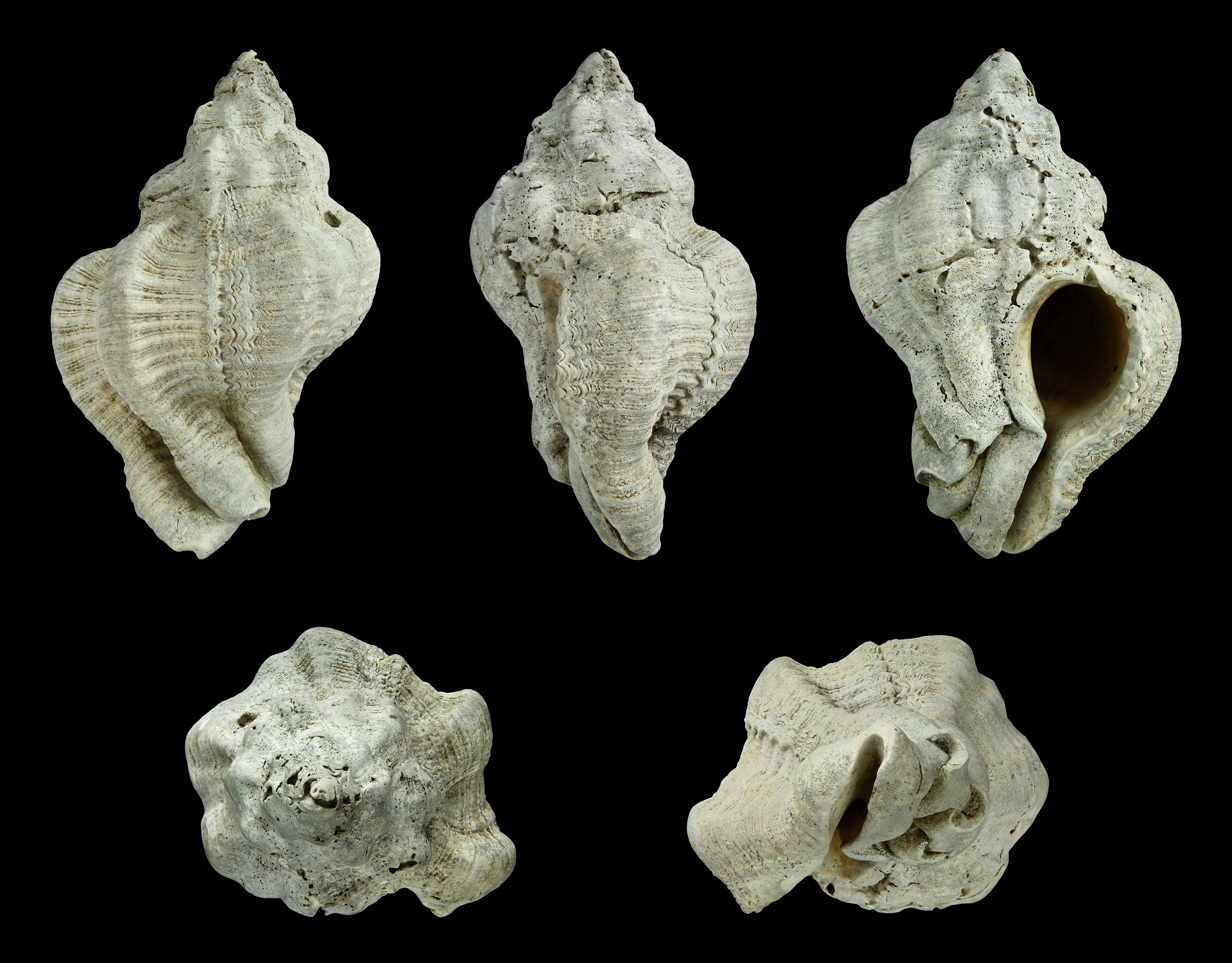
Hadriania trunculata

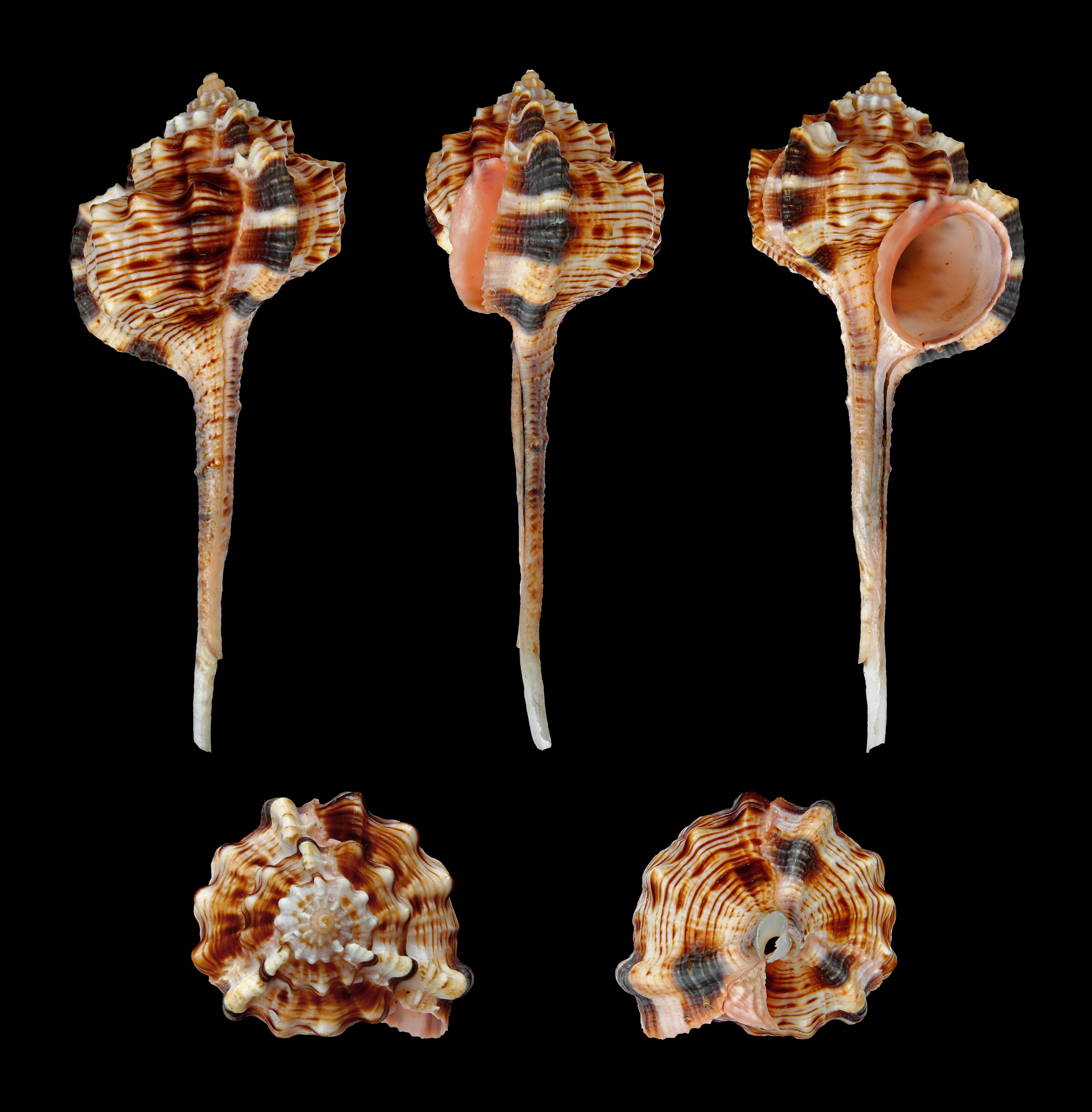
Haustellum haustellum

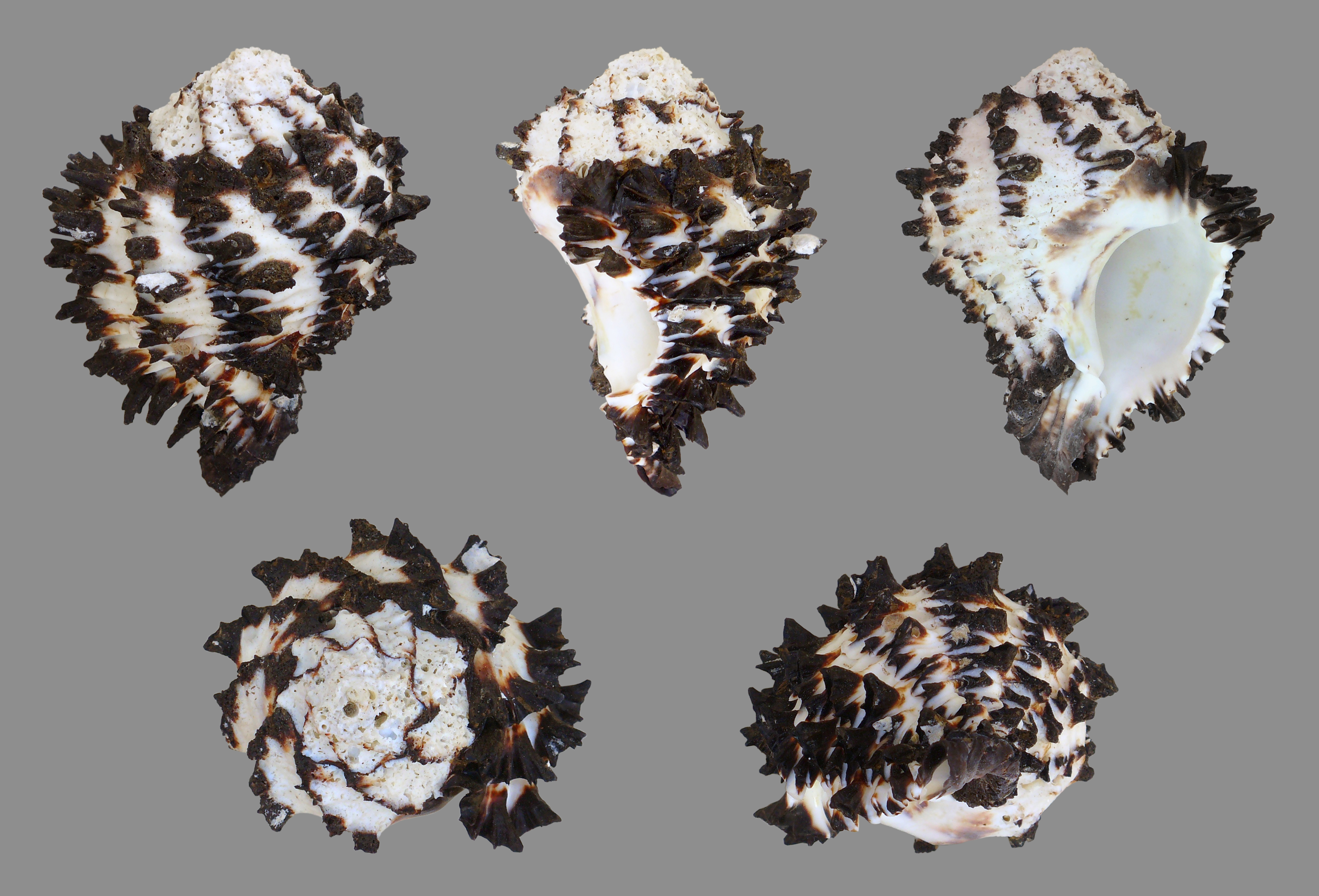
Hexaplex radix

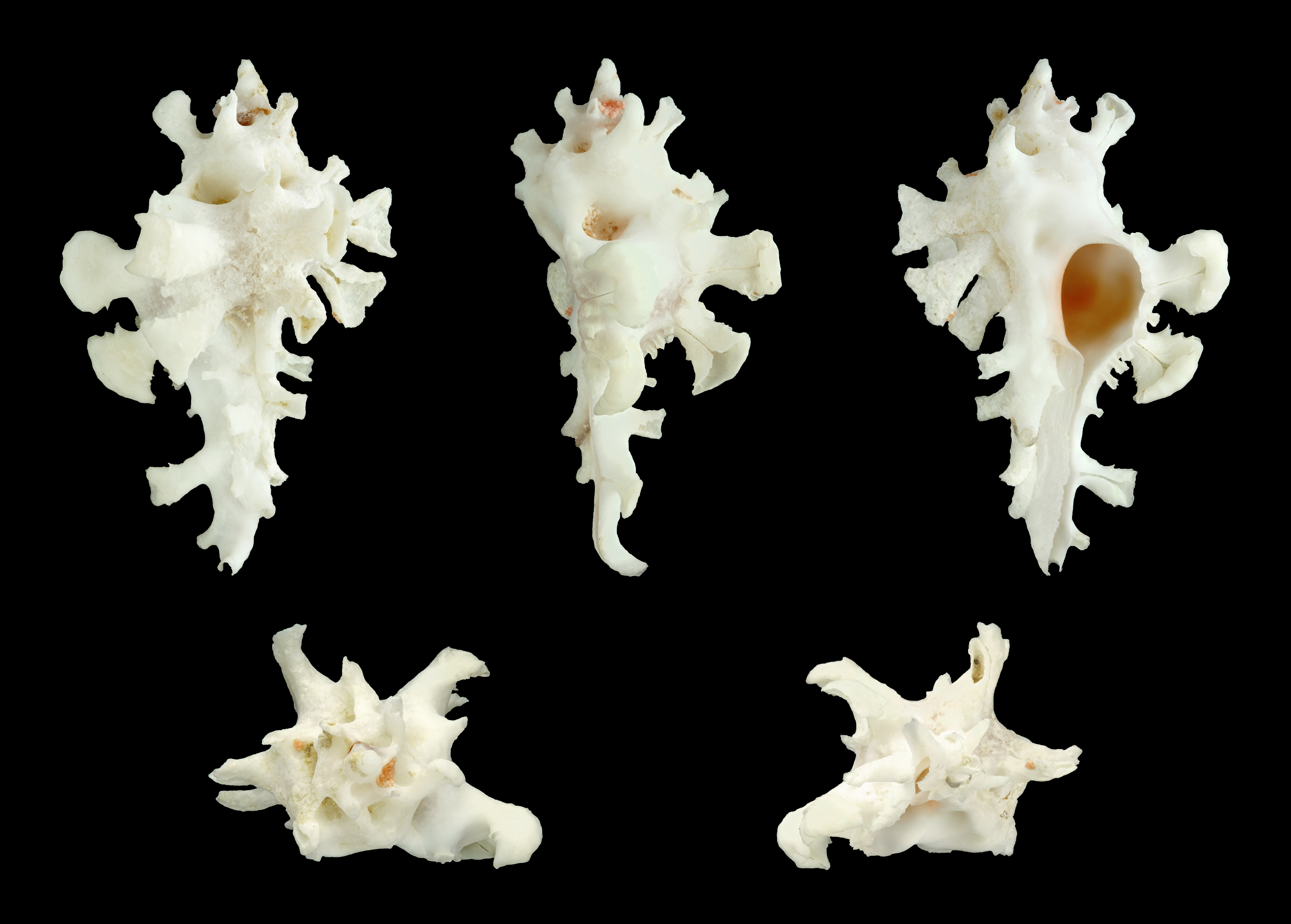
Homalocantha zamboi

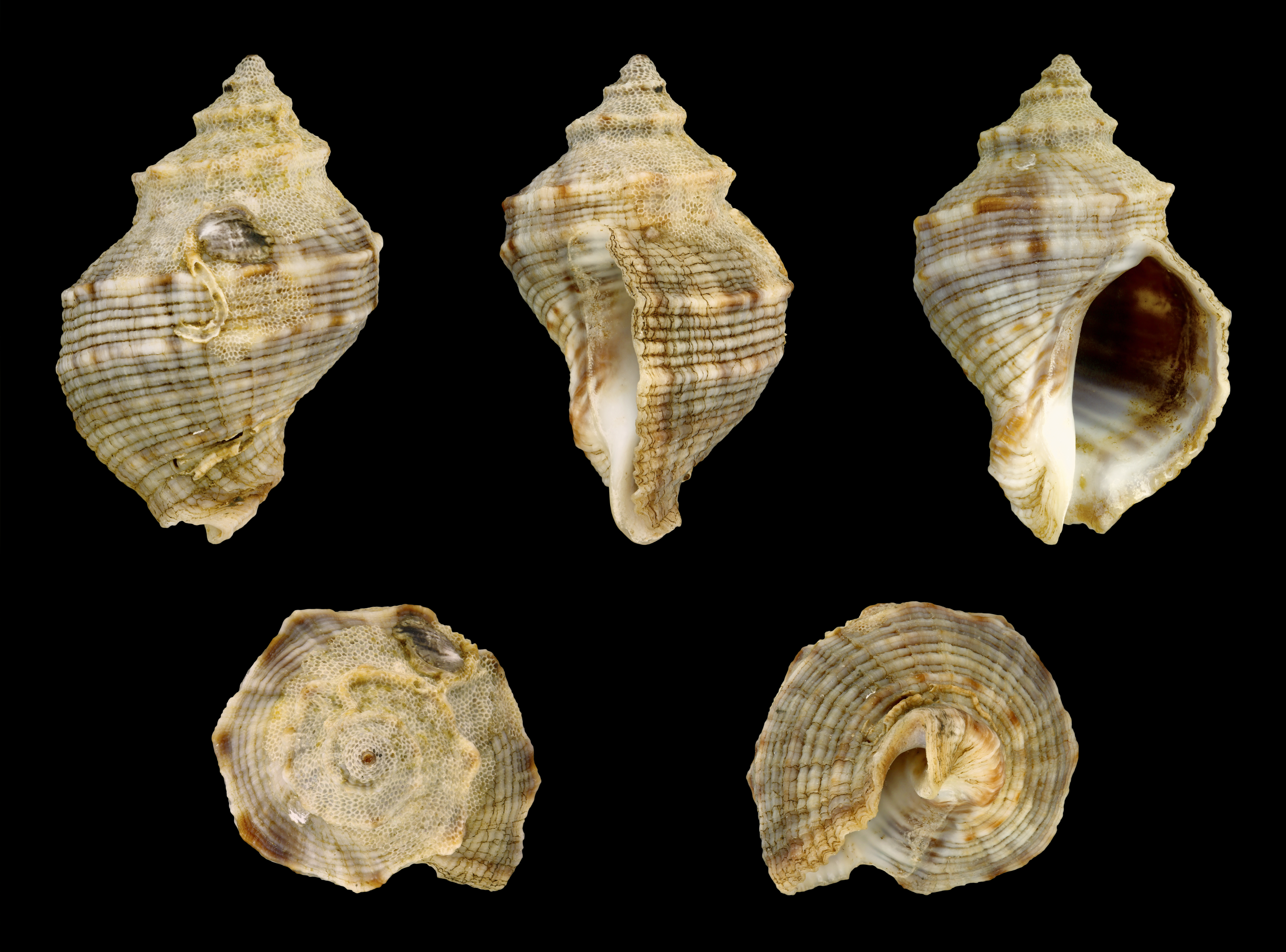
Indothais malayensis

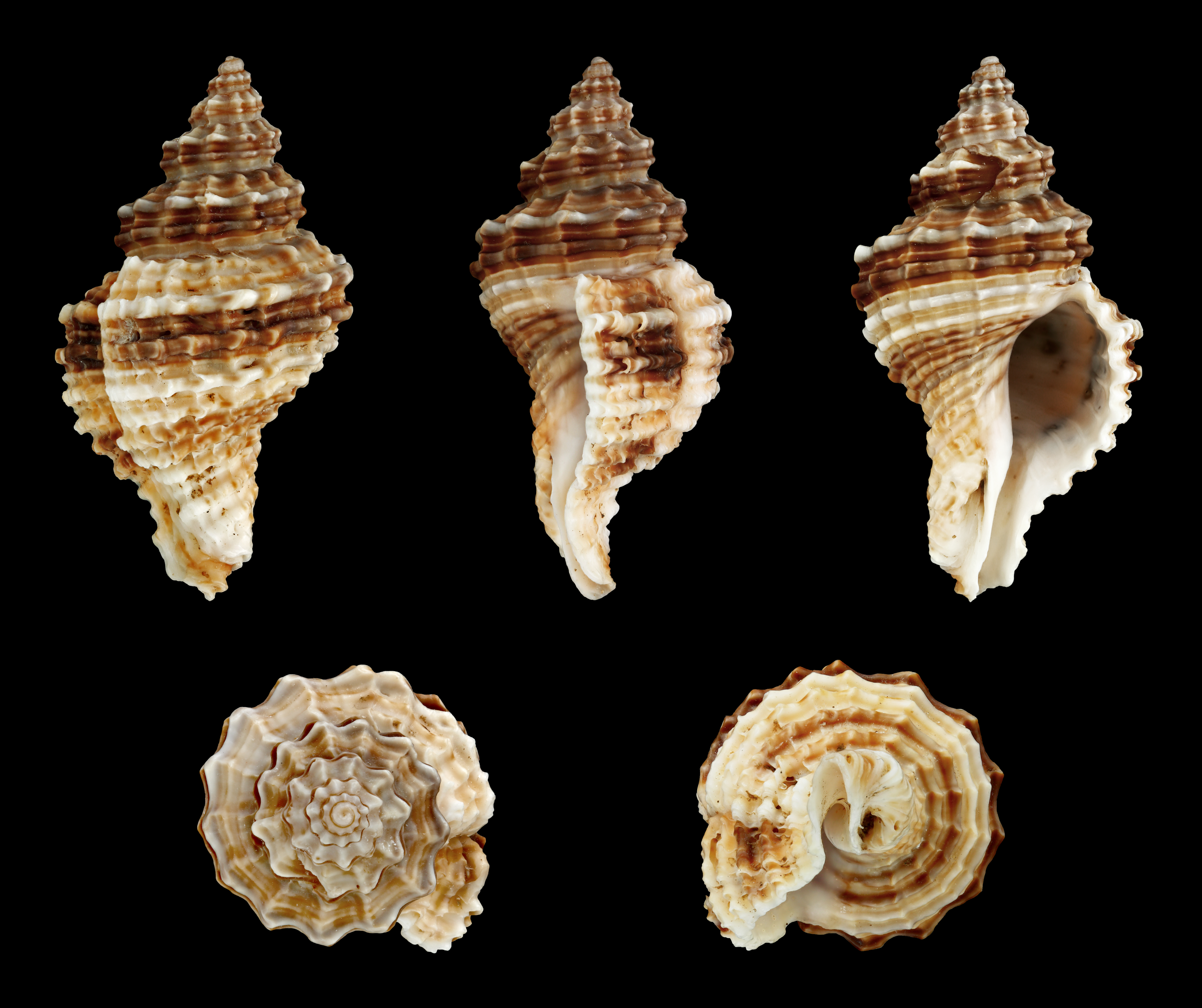
Lataxiena fimbriata

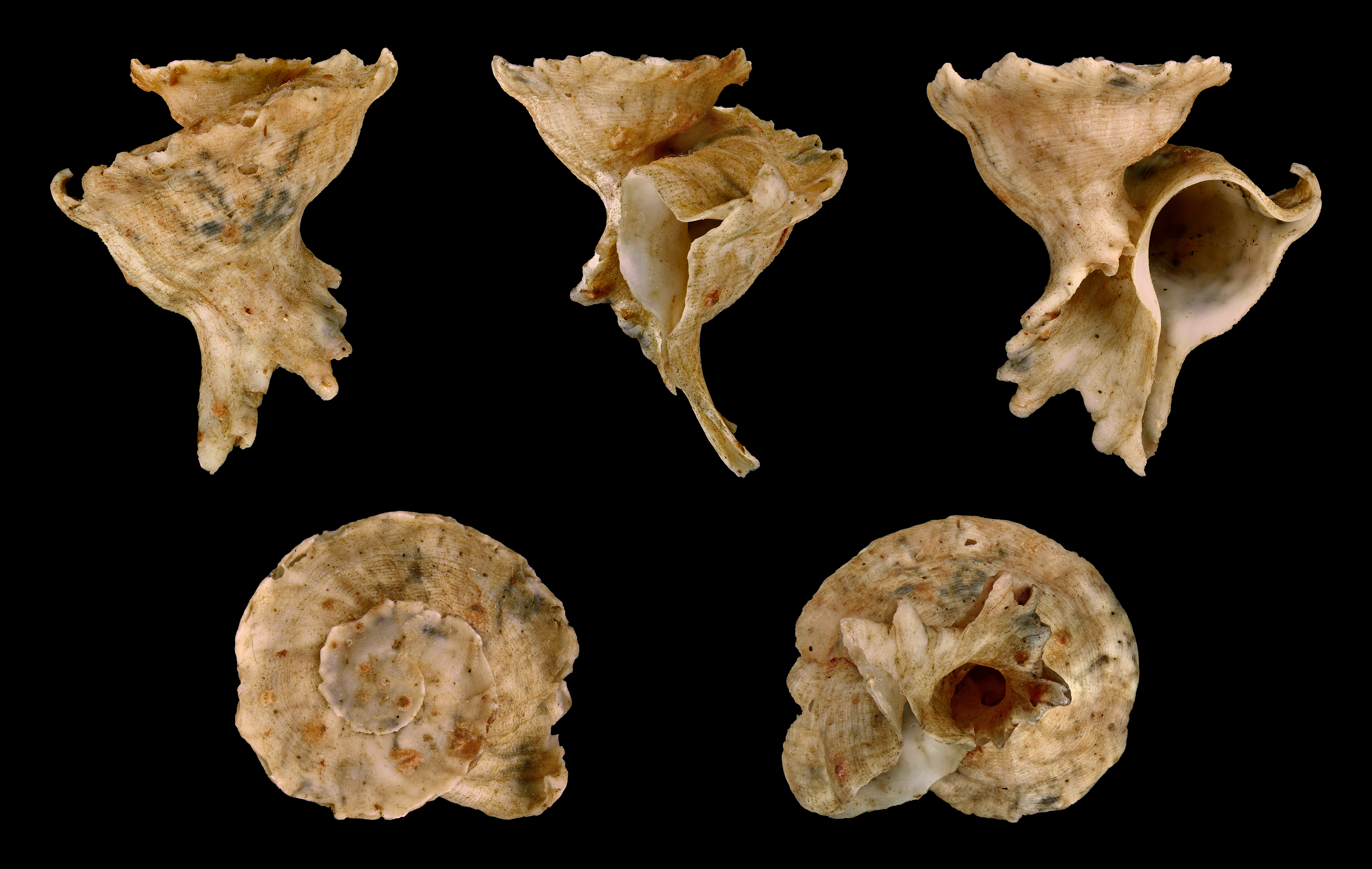
Latiaxis mawae

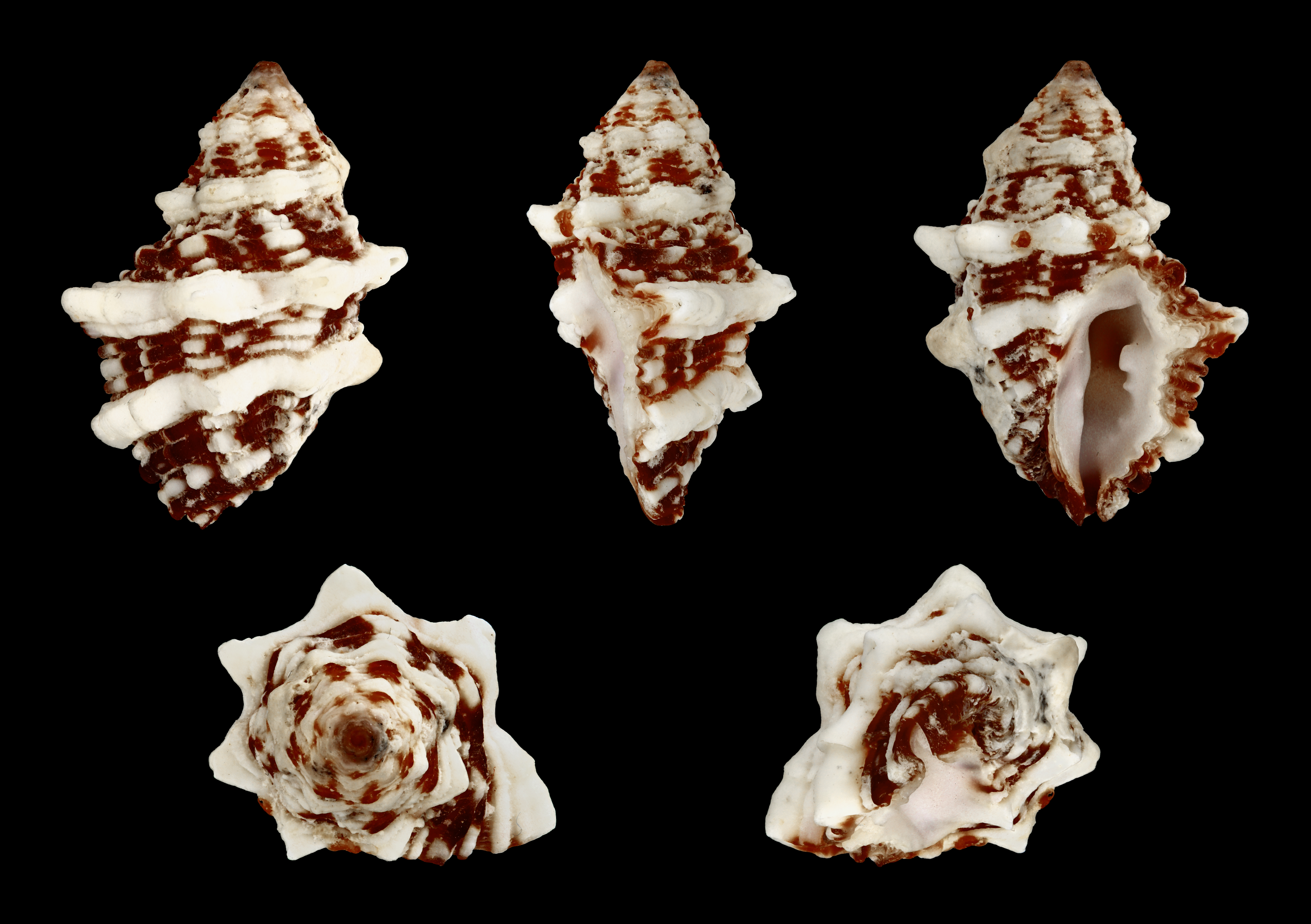
Morula biconica

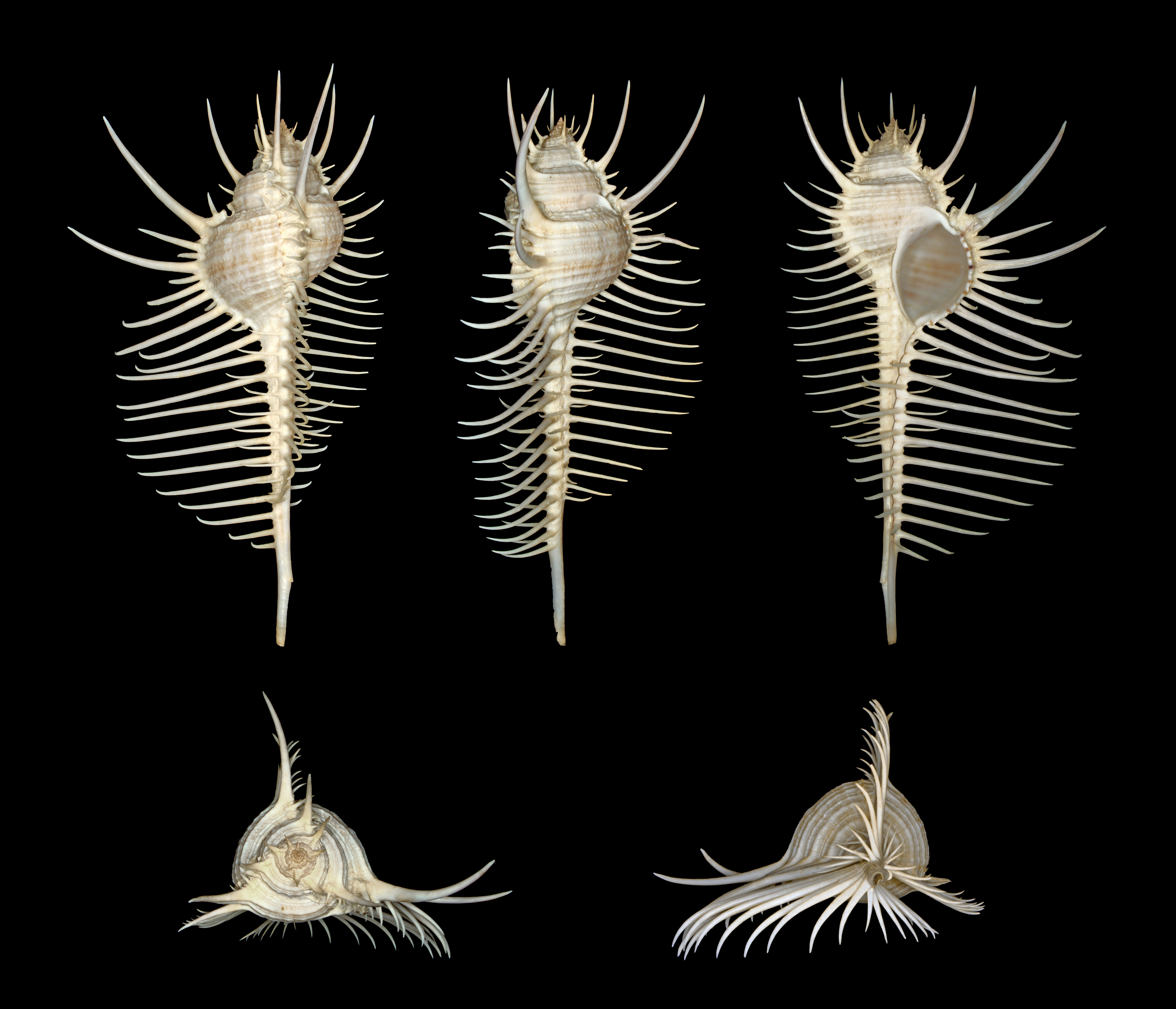
Murex pecten

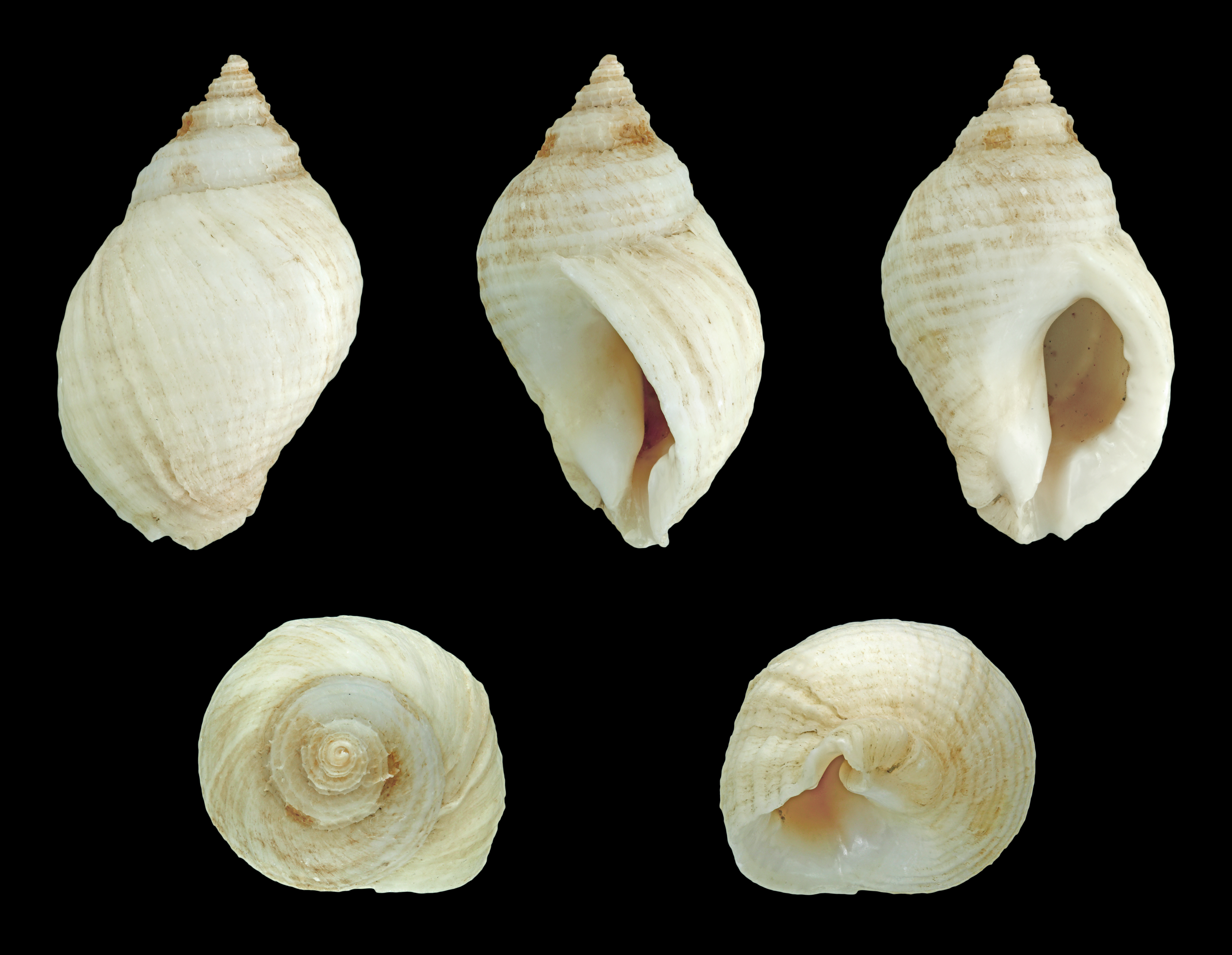
Nucella lapillus

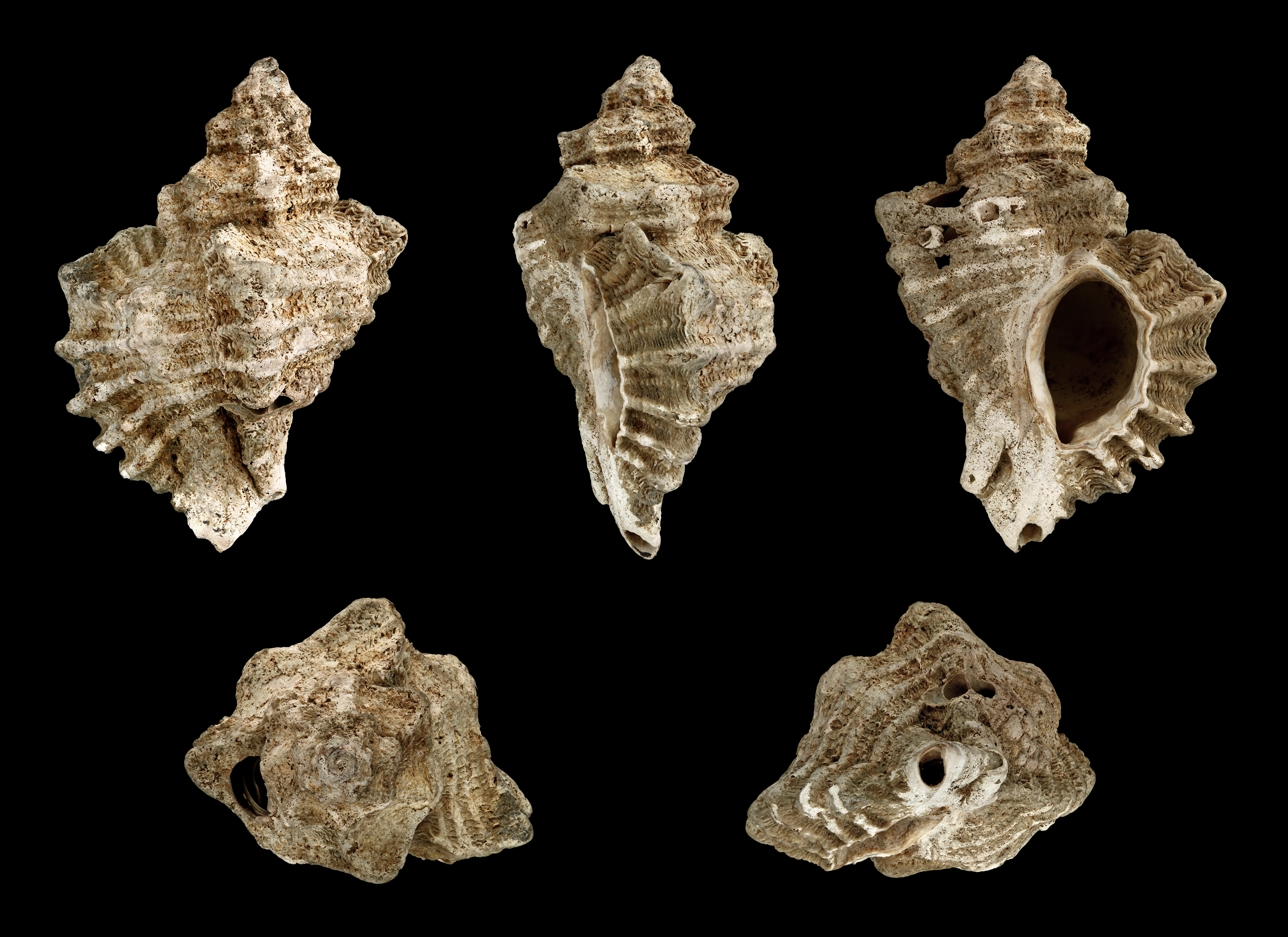
Ocenebra erinacea

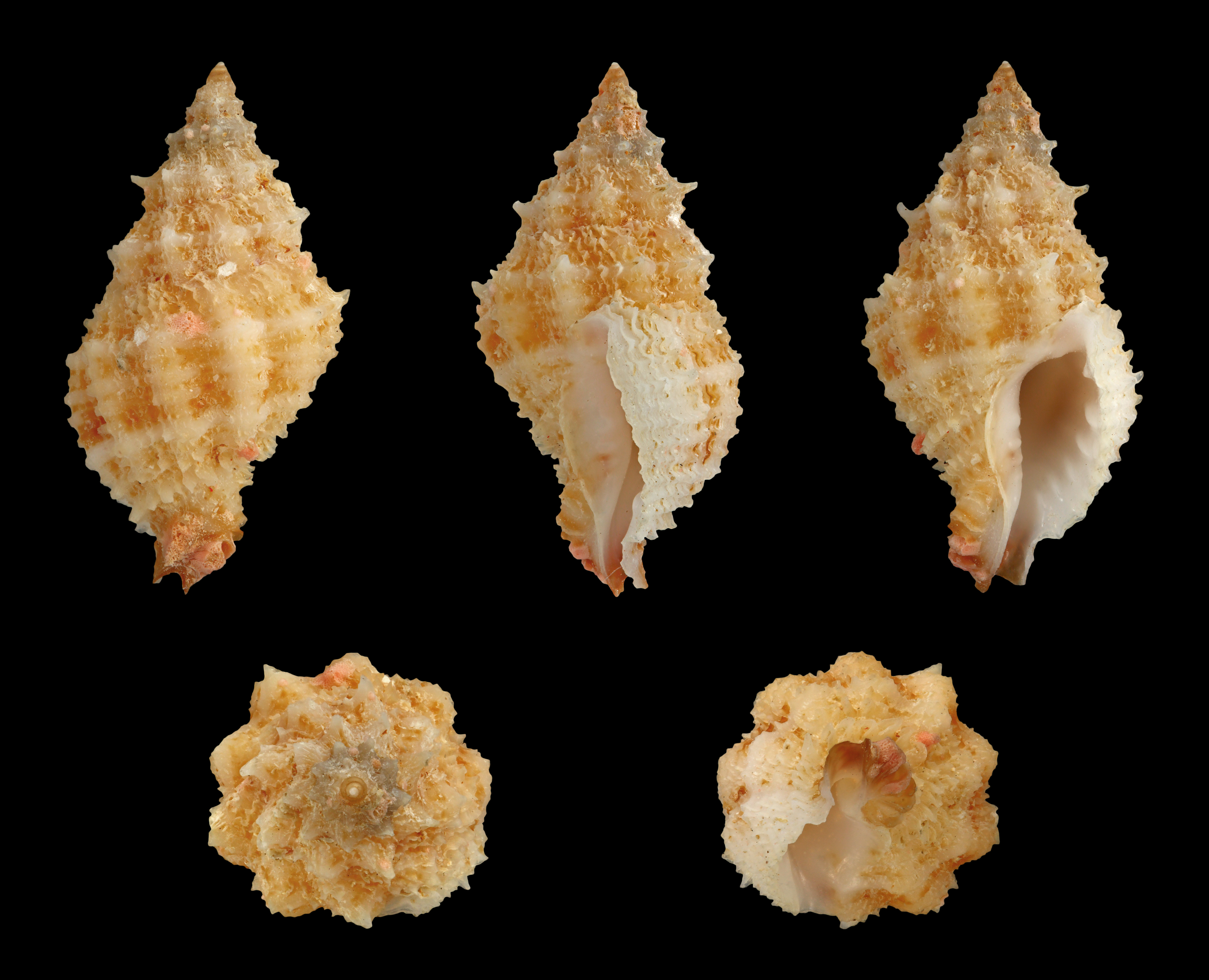
Orania pacifica

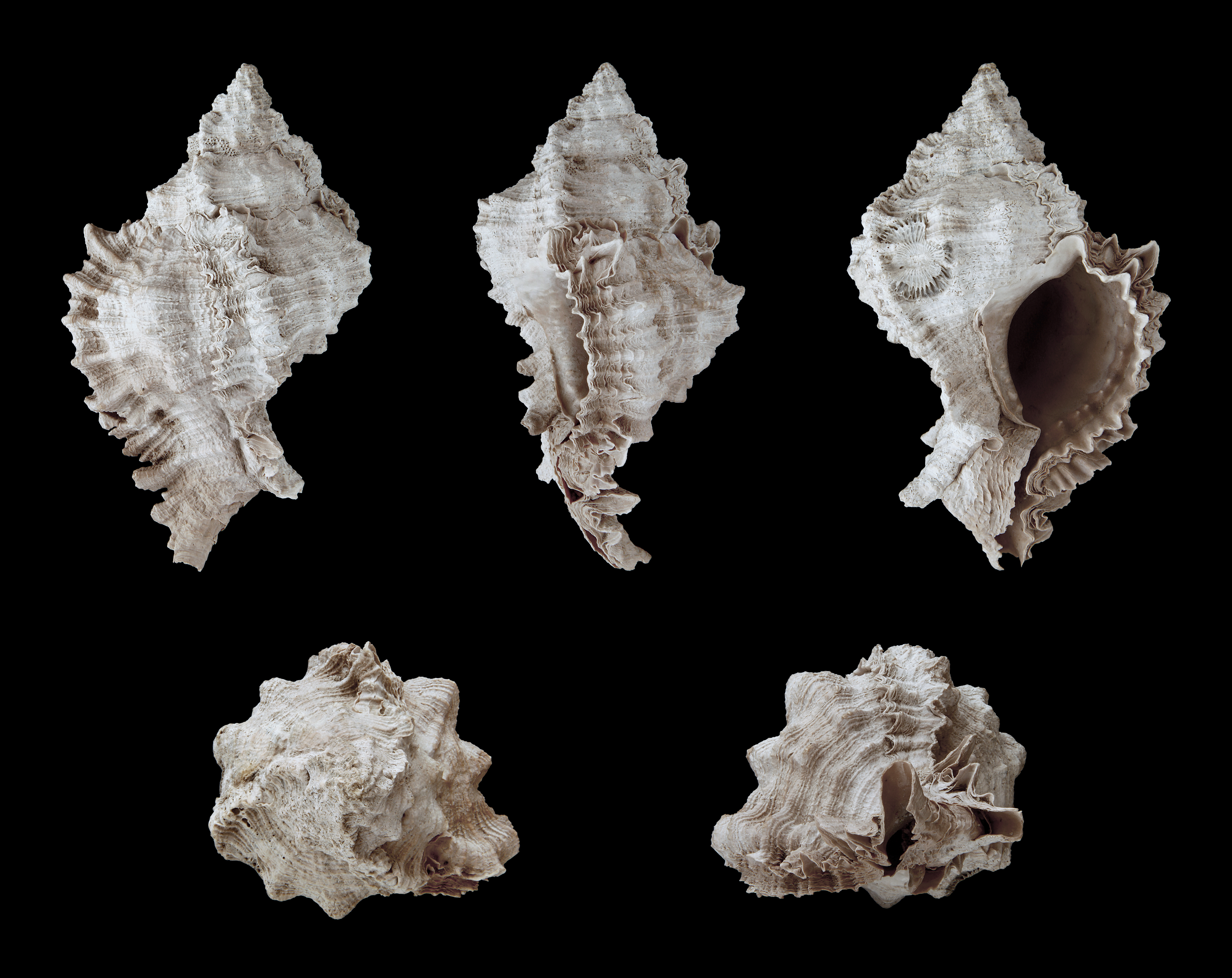
Phyllonotus evergladensis

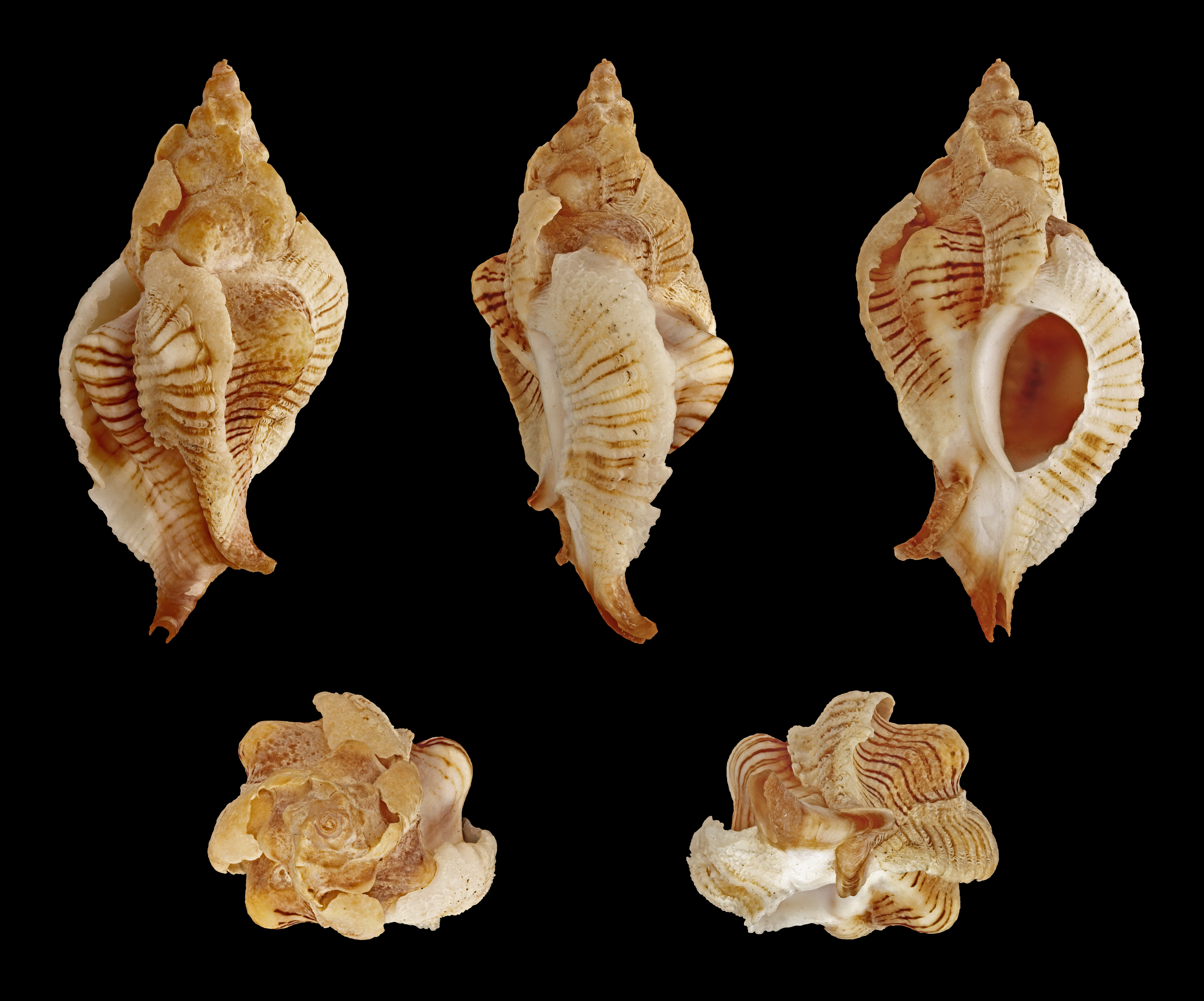
Pteropurpura festiva

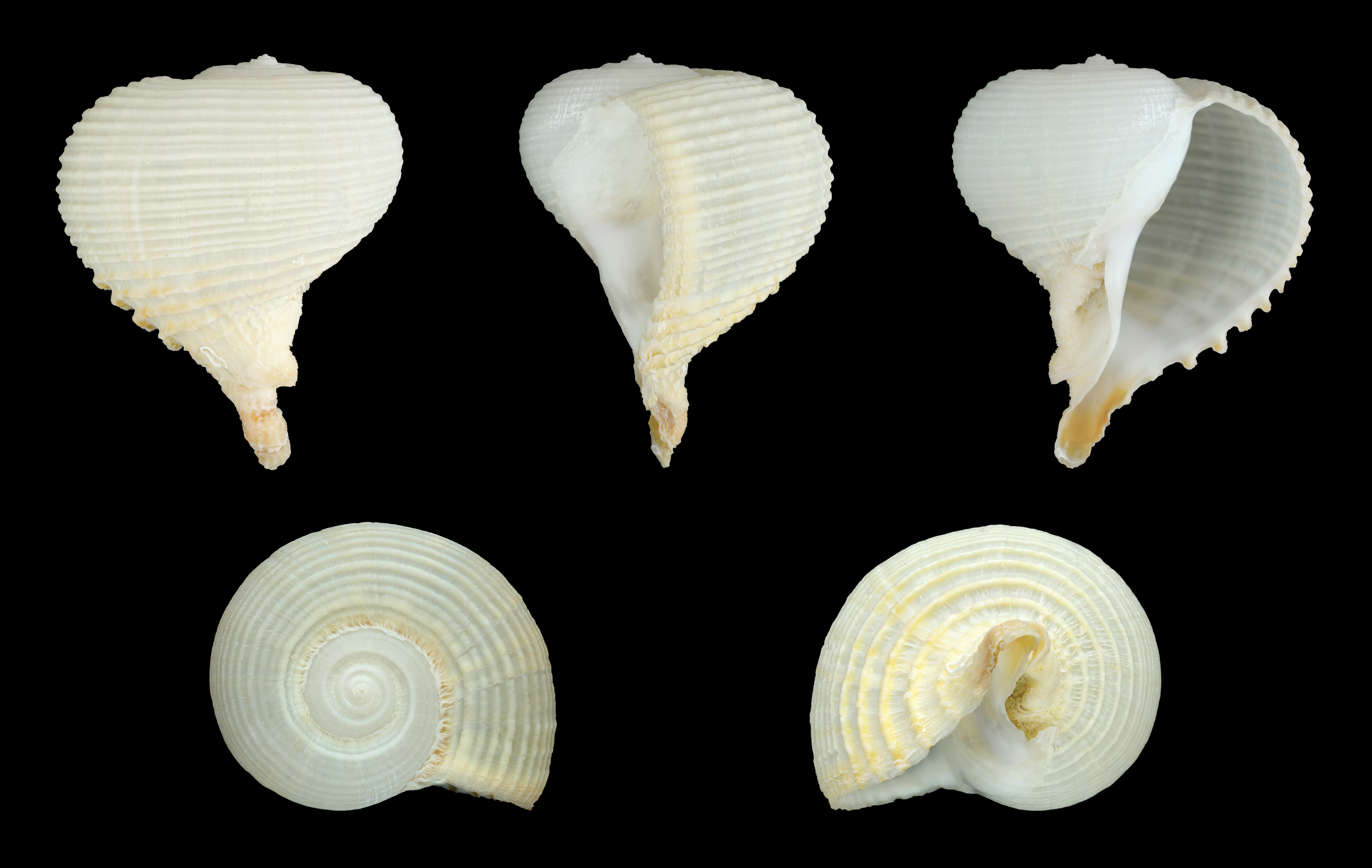
Rapa rapa

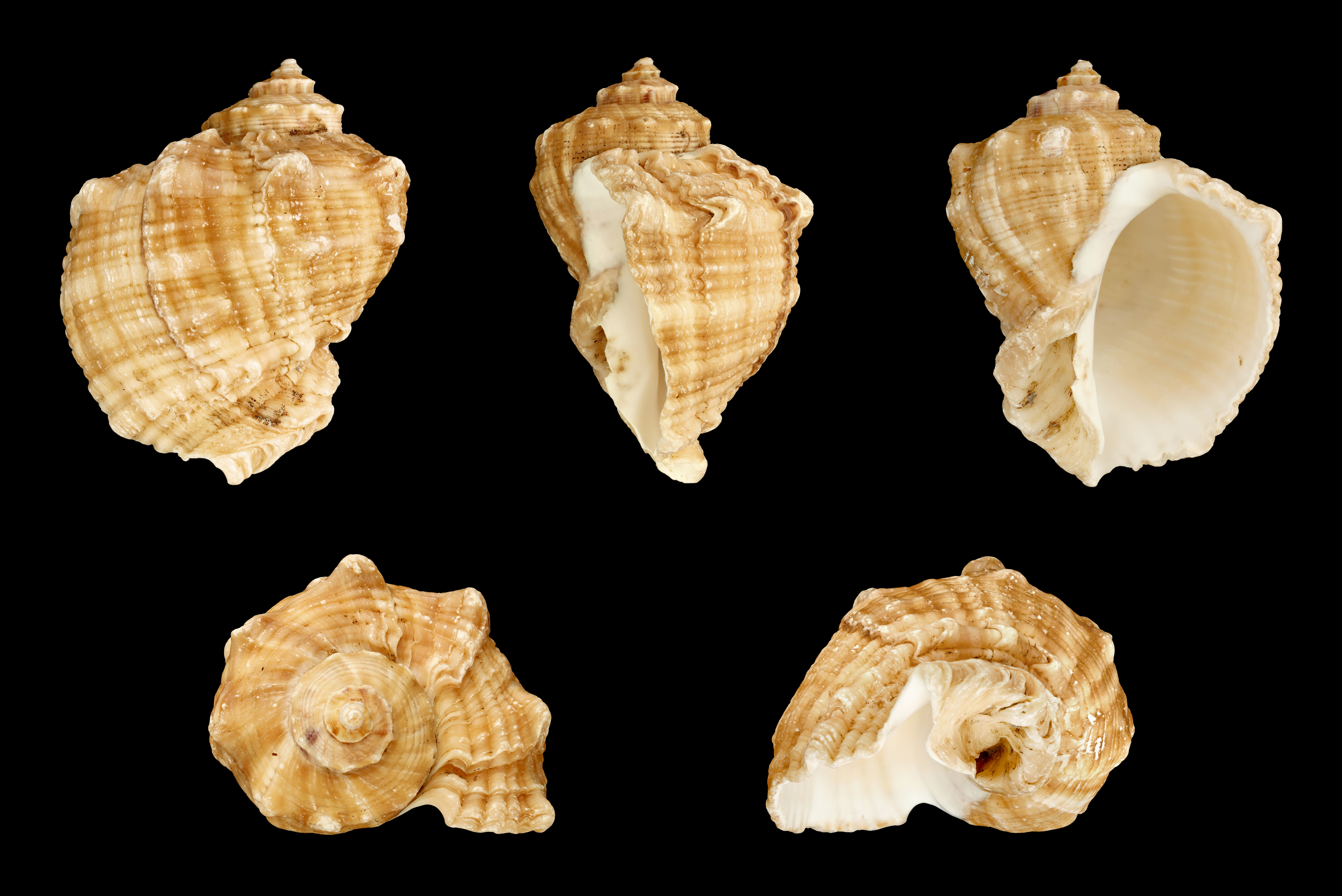
Rapana bezoar

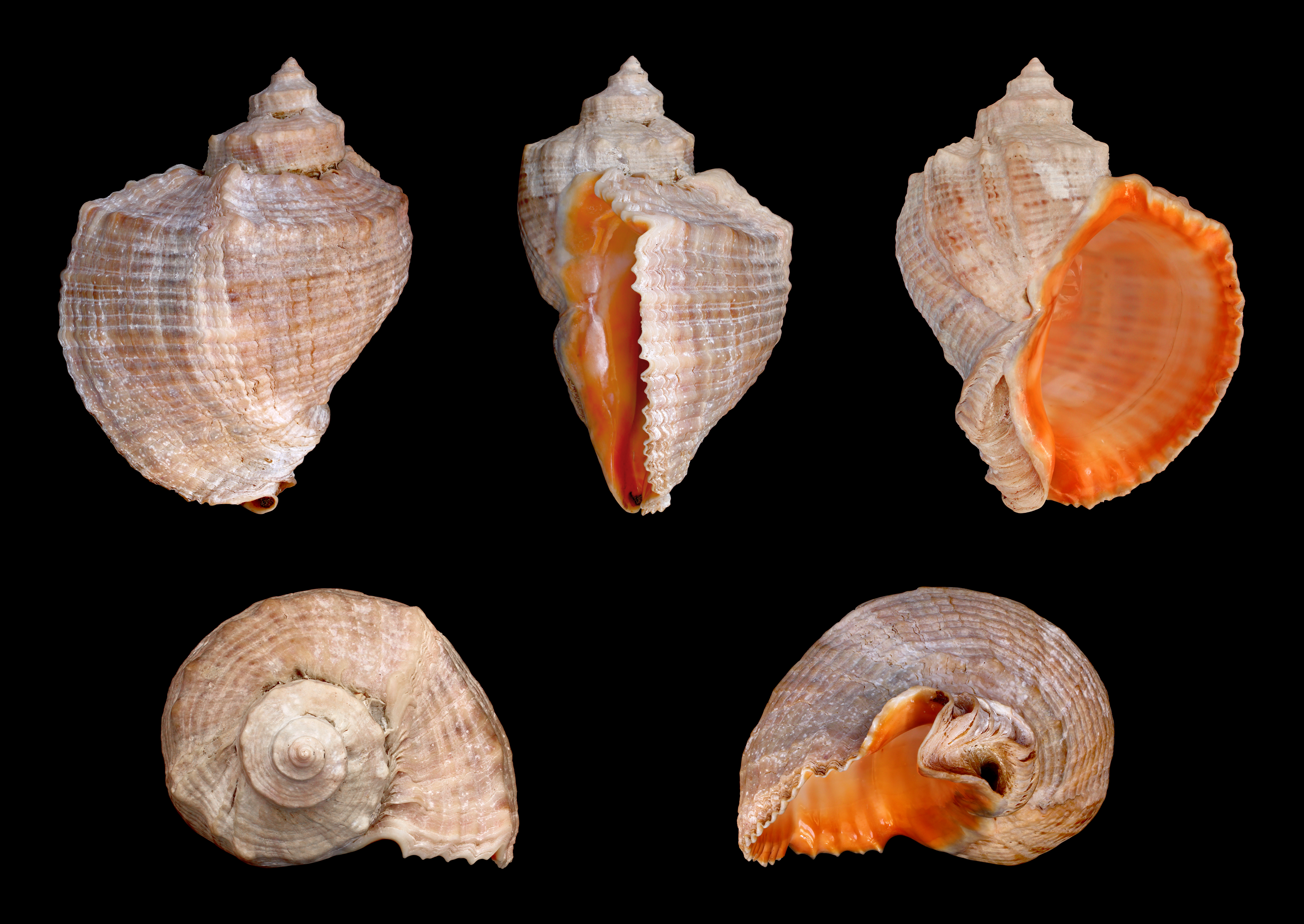
Rapana venosa

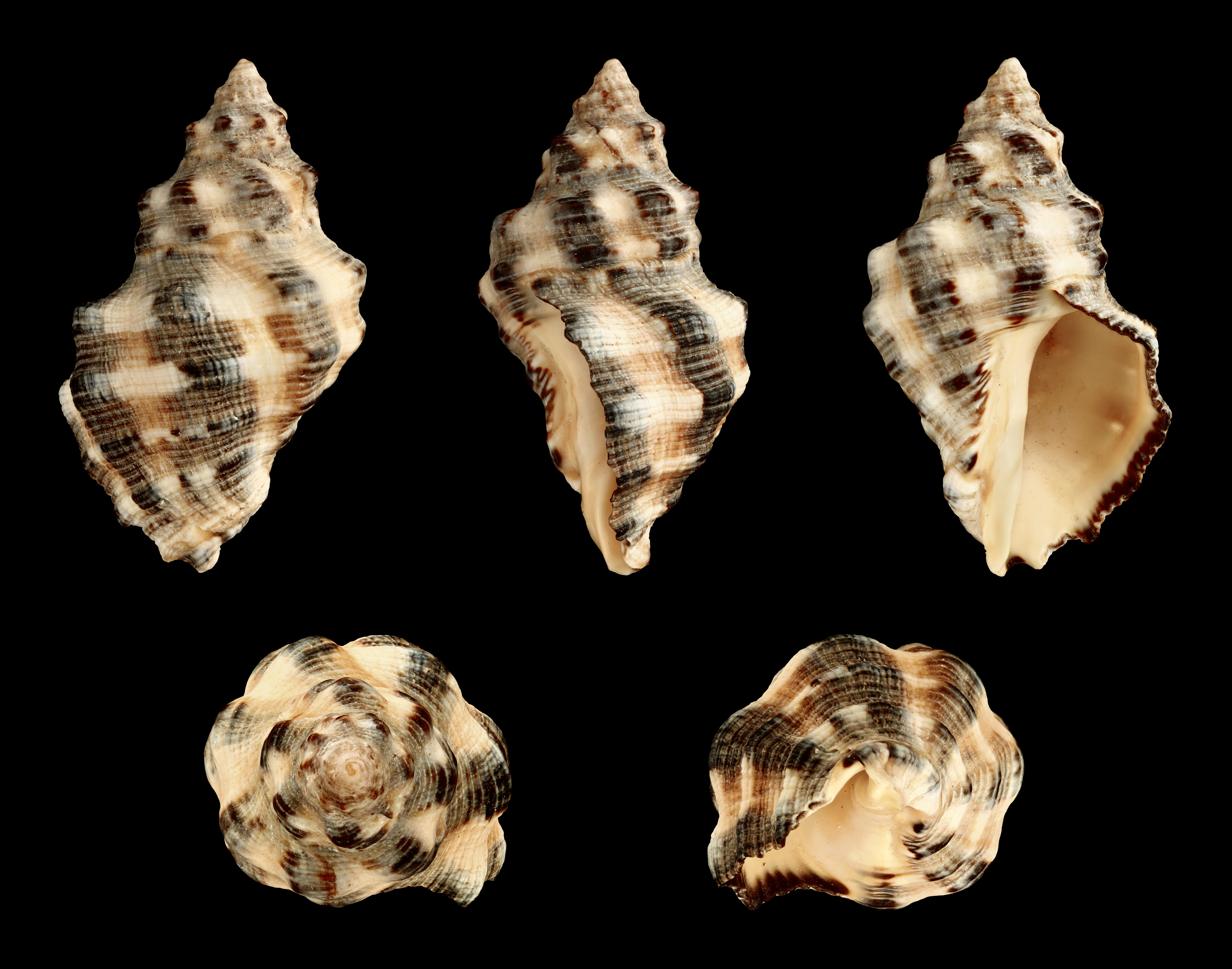
Reishia bronni

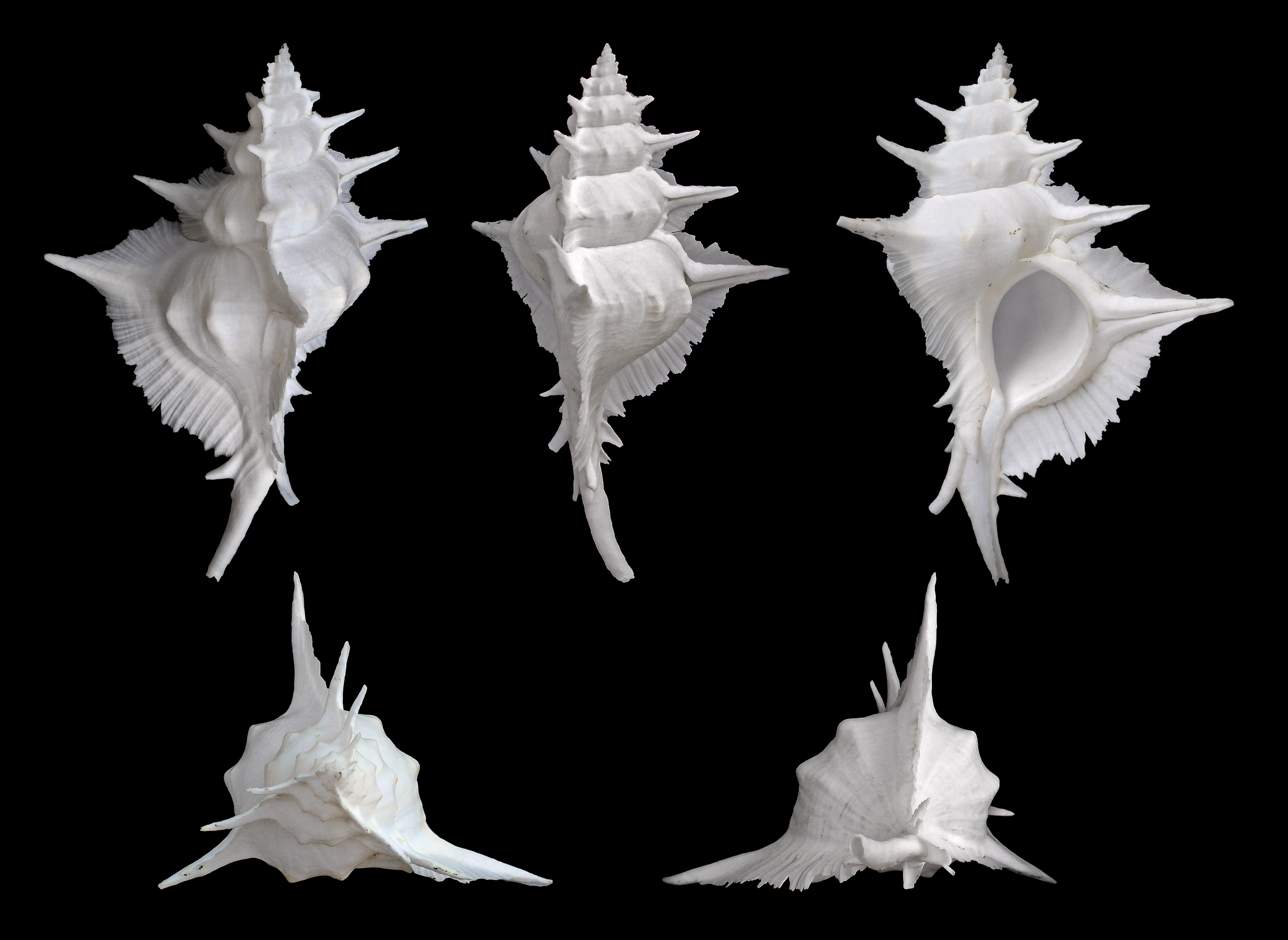
Siratus alabaster

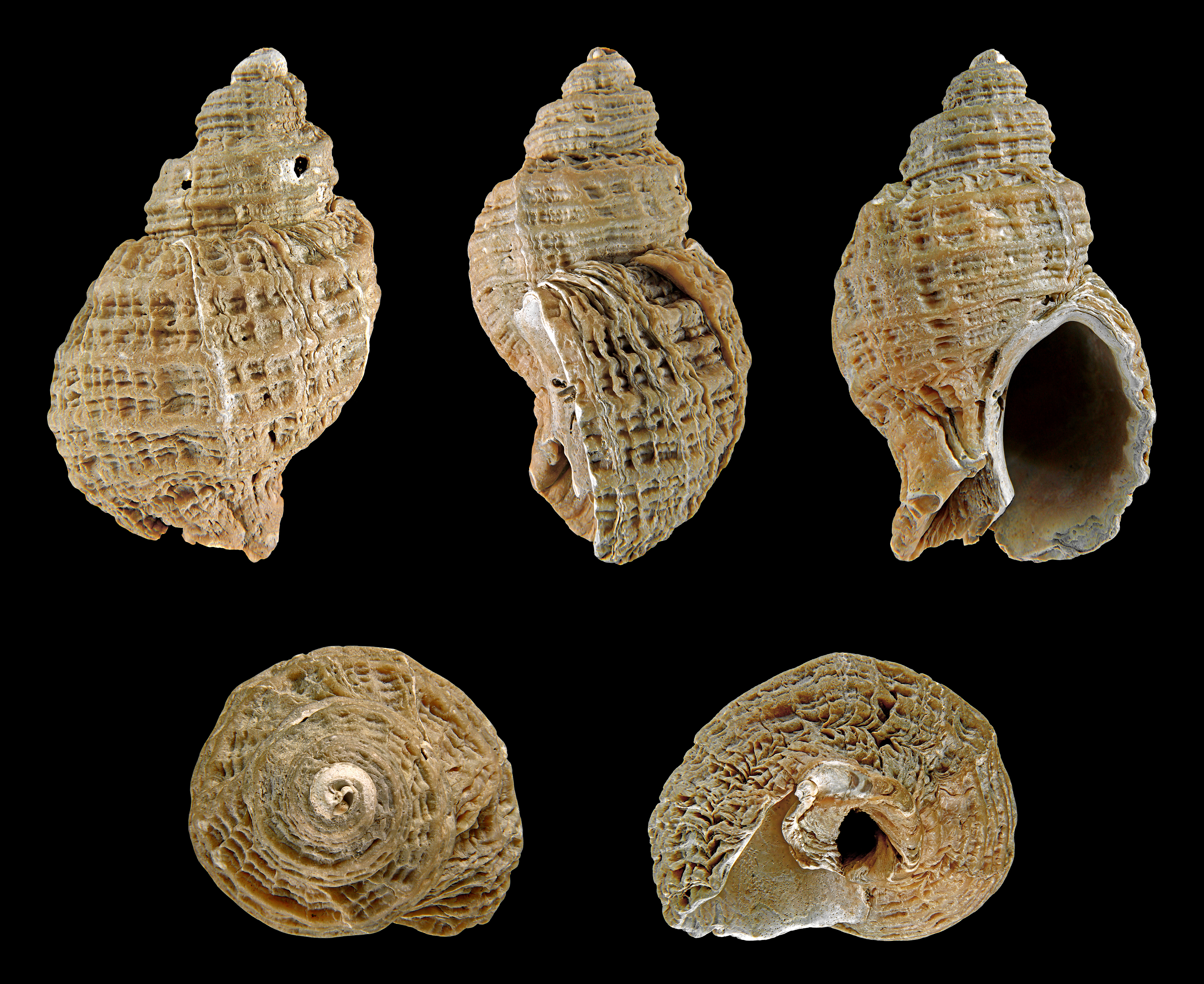
Spinucella tetragona

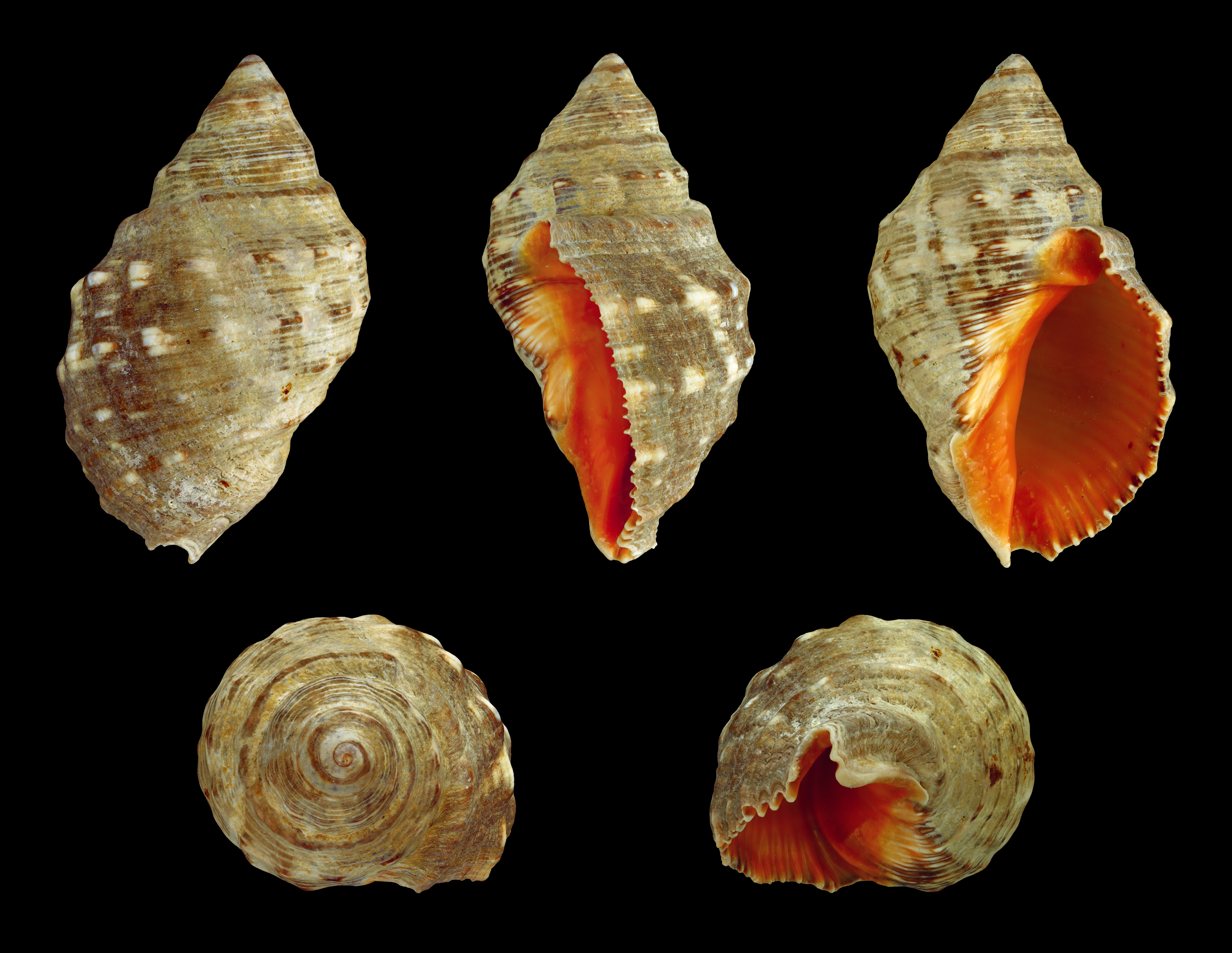
Stramonita haemastoma

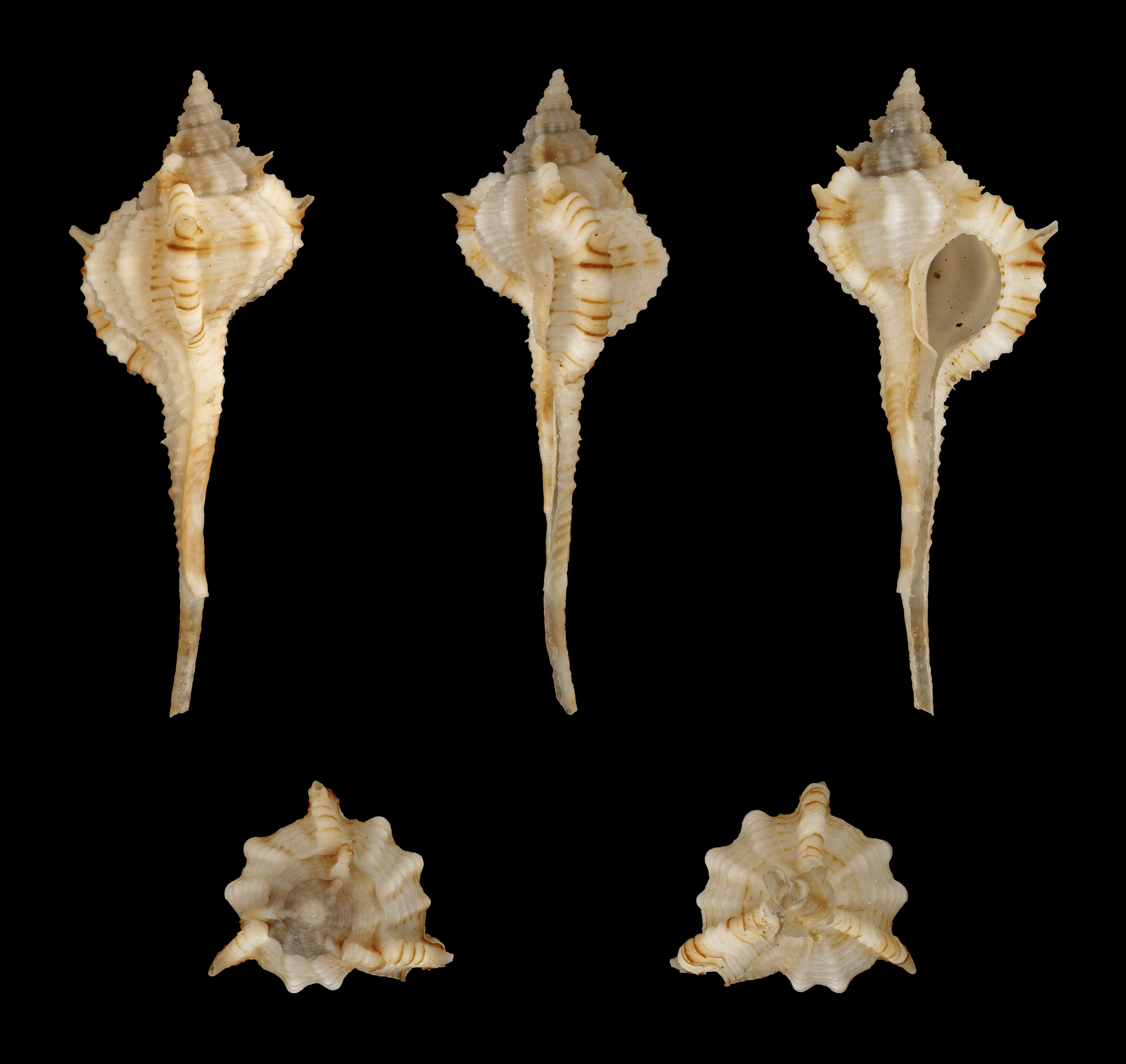
Vokesimurex gallinago
