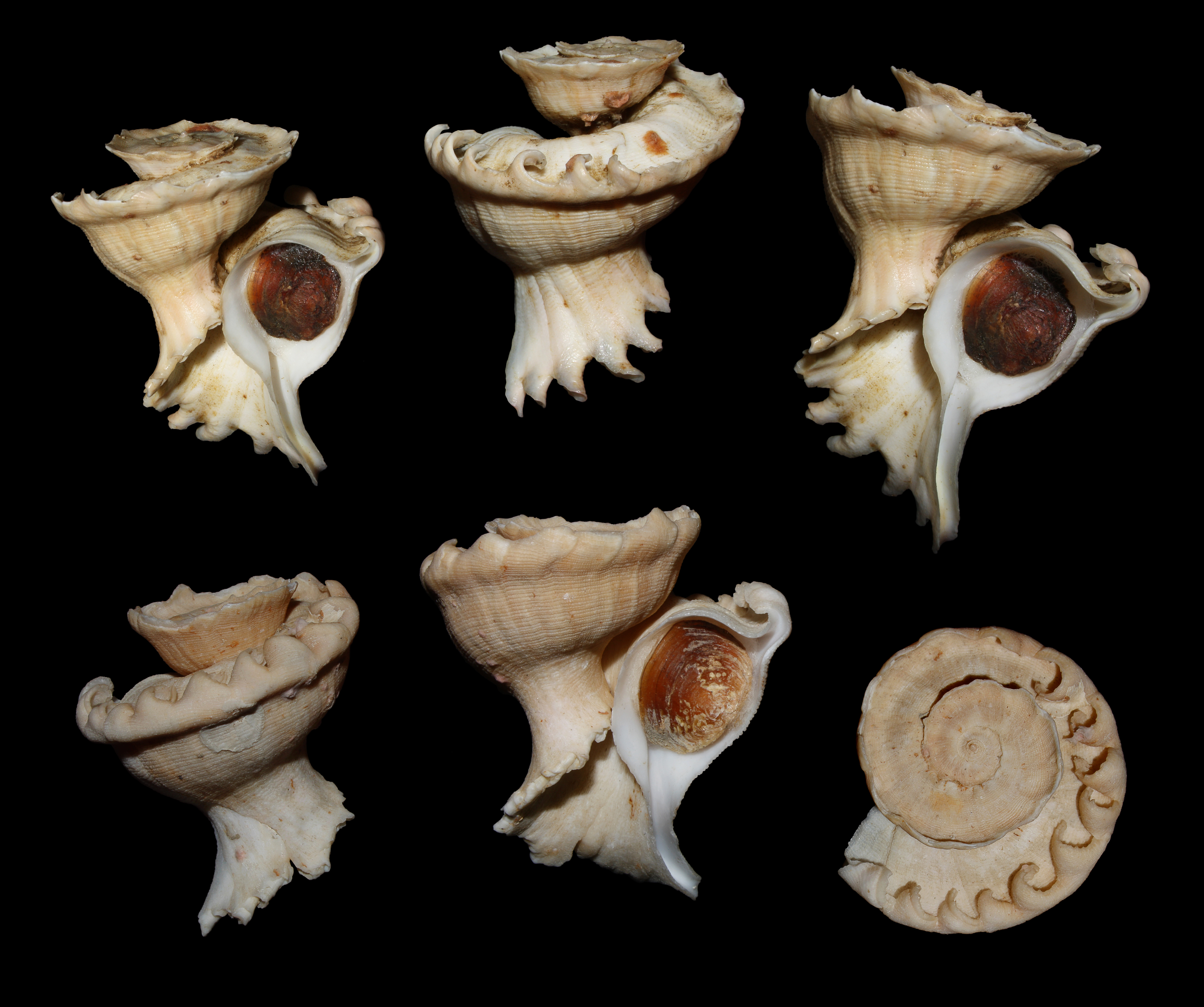
- Latiaxis mawae

Scientific classification
- Kingdom: Animalia
- Phylum: Mollusca
- Class: Gastropoda
- Subclass: Caenogastropoda
- Order: Neogastropoda
- Family: Muricidae
- Subfamily: Coralliophilinae
- Genus: Latiaxis; Swainson, 1840

Species
- See text

= Latiaxis =

Genus of gastropods

Latiaxis is a genus of medium-sized sea snails, marine gastropod mollusks in the family Muricidae, subfamily Coralliophilinae, the coral snails or coral shells.

== Species ==
Species within the genus Latiaxis include:

- Latiaxis cerinamarumai Kosuge, 1980
- Latiaxis hayashii Shikama, 1966
- Latiaxis mawae (Gray in Griffith & Pidgeon, 1834)
- Latiaxis naskensis Kantor & Sysoev, 1992
- Latiaxis nippooleifera Chino, 2014
- Latiaxis pilsbryi Hirase, 1908
- † Latiaxis roddai Ladd, 1982
- Latiaxis tabulatus Schepman, 1911 (uncertain, unassessed)
- † Latiaxis vinjucovi (L. Krishtofovich, 1954)
- † Latiaxis yabei Nomura, 1935

Species mentioned in ITIS

- Latiaxis costatus (Blainville, 1832) - California coralsnail
- Latiaxis kincaidi Dall, 1919
- Latiaxis mansfieldi (McGinty, 1940)

Synonyms

- Latiaxis armatus G.B. Sowerby III, 1912: synonym of Babelomurex armatus (G.B. Sowerby III, 1912)
- Latiaxis babelis (Requien, 1849) and Latiaxis cariniferus (Sowerby G.B. I, 1834) are synonyms for Babelomurex cariniferus (Sowerby, 1834)
- Latiaxis benoiti (Tiberi, 1855): synonym of Babelomurex benoiti (Tiberi, 1855)
- Latiaxis bernardi K. Nicolay, 1984: synonym of Babelomurex bernardi (Nicolay, 1984) (superseded combination)
- Latiaxis cariniferoides Shikama, 1966: synonym of Babelomurex cariniferoides (Shikama, 1966)
- Latiaxis cariniferus (Sowerby G.B. I, 1834): synonym of Babelomurex cariniferus (Sowerby, 1834)
- Latiaxis castaneocinctus Kosuge, 1980: synonym of Babelomurex princeps (Melvill, 1912)
- Latiaxis chiangi Lan, 1982: synonym of Coralliophila abnormis (E.A. Smith, 1878)
- Latiaxis couturieri Jousseaume, 1898: synonym of Babelomurex couturieri (Jousseaume, 1898)
- Latiaxis dalli (Emerson and D'Attilio, 1963): synonym of Babelomurex dalli (W. K. Emerson & D'Attilio, 1963)
- Latiaxis echinatus Azuma, 1960: synonym of Babelomurex echinatus (Azuma, 1960)
- Latiaxis elstoni Barnard, 1962: synonym of Toxiclionella elstoni (Barnard, 1962)
- Latiaxis fearnleyi Emerson & D'Attilio, 1965: synonym of Coralliophila fearnleyi (Emerson & D'Attilio, 1965)
- Latiaxis fenestratus Kosuge, 1980: synonym of Babelomurex wormaldi (Powell, 1971)
- Latiaxis filiaregis Kurohara, 1959: synonym of Hirtomurex filiaregis (Kurohara, 1959)
- Latiaxis filiaris Shikama, 1978: synonym of Babelomurex filialis (Shikama, 1978)
- Latiaxis fruticosus Kosuge, 1979: synonym of Babelomurex fruticosus (Kosuge, 1979)
- Latiaxis gemmatus Shikama, 1966: synonym of Babelomurex diadema (A. Adams, 1854)
- Latiaxis helenae Azuma, 1973: synonym of Babelomurex fusiformis (Martens, 1902)
- Latiaxis jeanneae D'Attilio & Myers, 1984: synonym of Babelomurex spinosus (Hirase, 1908)
- Latiaxis juliae Clench and Aquayo, 1939: synonym of Babelomurex juliae (Clench & Aguayo, 1939)
- Latiaxis kanamarui Shikama, 1978: synonym of Babelomurex indicus (E.A. Smith, 1899)
- Latiaxis kawanishii Kosuge, 1979: synonym of Babelomurex kawanishii (Kosuge, 1979)
- Latiaxis kawamurai Kuroda, 1959: synonym of Babelomurex kawamurai (Kira, 1959)
- Latiaxis kieneri Hidalgo, 1904: synonym of Babelomurex indicus (E.A. Smith, 1899)
- Latiaxis kiranus Kuroda, 1959: synonym of Babelomurex indicus (E.A. Smith, 1899)
- Latiaxis laevicostatus Kosuge, 1981: synonym of Babelomurex laevicostatus (Kosuge, 1981) (original combination)
- Latiaxis latipinnatus Azuma, 1961: synonym of Babelomurex latipinnatus (M. Azuma, 1961) (superseded combination)
- Latiaxis lischkeanus (Dunker, 1882): synonym of Babelomurex lischkeanus (Dunker, 1882) (superseded combination)
- Latiaxis macutanica Kosuge, 1979: synonym of Babelomurex diadema (A. Adams, 1854)
- Latiaxis mamimarumai Kosuge, 1981: synonym of Mipus mamimarumai (Kosuge, 1981)
- Latiaxis marumai Habe & Kosuge, 1970: synonym of Babelomurex marumai (Habe & Kosuge, 1970)
- Latiaxis mediopacificus Kosuge, 1979: synonym of Babelomurex mediopacificus (Kosuge, 1979)
- Latiaxis michikoae Shikama, 1978: synonym of Babelomurex indicus (E.A. Smith, 1899)
- Latiaxis multispinosus Shikama, 1966: synonym of Babelomurex spinosus (Hirase, 1908)
- Latiaxis nagahorii Kosuge, 1980: synonym of Babelomurex nagahorii (Kosuge, 1980)
- Latiaxis nakamigawai Kuroda, 1959: synonym of Babelomurex nakamigawai (Kuroda, 1959)
- Latiaxis nakayasui Shikama, 1970: synonym of Babelomurex nakayasui (Shikama, 1970)
- Latiaxis princeps: synonym of Babelomurex princeps (Melvill, 1912)
- Latiaxis purpuraterminus Kosuge, 1979 : synonym of Babelomurex purpuraterminus (Kosuge, 1979)
- Latiaxis sallei Jousseaume, 1884 : synonym of Babelomurex japonicus (Dunker, 1882)
- Latiaxis scobina Kilburn, 1973 : synonym of Hirtomurex winckworthi (Fulton, 1930)
- Latiaxis sentix (Bayer, 1971) : synonym of Babelomurex sentix (Bayer, 1971)
- Latiaxis shingomarumai Kosuge, 1981 : synonym of Babelomurex shingomarumai (Kosuge, 1981)
- Latiaxis sibogae Schepman, 1911 : synonym of Pazinotus sibogae (Schepman, 1911)
- Latiaxis spinosus Hirase, 1908 : synonym of Babelomurex spinosus (Hirase, 1908)
- Latiaxis teramachii Kuroda, 1959 : synonym of Hirtomurex teramachii (Kuroda, 1959)
- Latiaxis tortilis A. Adams, 1867 : synonym of Mipus gyratus (Hinds, 1844)
- Latiaxis tortuosus Azuma, 1961 : synonym of Mipus tortuosus (Azuma, 1961)
- Latiaxis tosanus Hirase, 1908 : synonym of Babelomurex tosanus (Hirase, 1908)
- Latiaxis translucida Kosuge, 1981 : synonym of Hirtomurex winckworthi (Fulton, 1930)
- Latiaxis tuberosus Kosuge, 1980 : synonym of Babelomurex tuberosus (Kosuge, 1980)
- Latiaxis tumidus Kosuge, 1980 : synonym of Babelomurex tumidus (Kosuge, 1980)
- Latiaxis vicdani Kosuge, 1980: synonym of Mipus vicdani (Kosuge, 1980)
- Latiaxis winckworthi Fulton, 1930 : synonym of Hirtomurex winckworthi (Fulton, 1930)
- Latiaxis wormaldi Powell, 1971: synonym of Babelomurex wormaldi (Powell, 1971)
