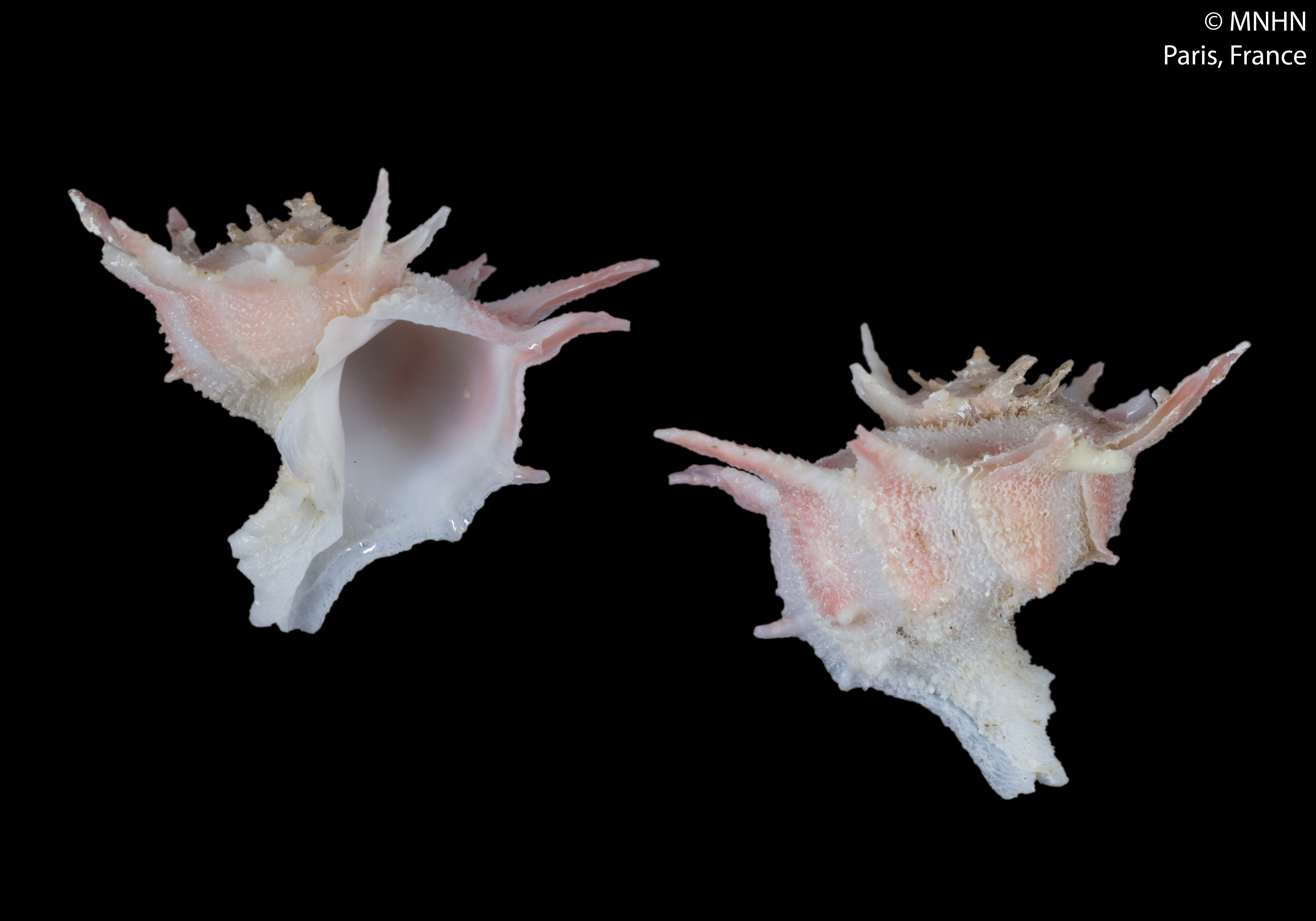
- Shell of Babelomurex neocaledonicus (holotype at MNHN, Paris)

Scientific classification
- Kingdom: Animalia
- Phylum: Mollusca
- Class: Gastropoda
- Subclass: Caenogastropoda
- Order: Neogastropoda
- Family: Muricidae
- Genus: Babelomurex
- Species: B. neocaledonicus

Binomial name
- Babelomurex neocaledonicus Kosuge & Oliverio, 2001

= Babelomurex neocaledonicus =

Species of gastropod

Babelomurex neocaledonicus is a species of sea snail, a marine gastropod mollusc in the family Muricidae, the murex snails or rock snails.

== Description ==
B. neocaledonicus has a height of 25-31 mm.

The spire is low and conical, with a sharply angled shoulder. The major set of triangular spines occurs on the shoulder, with over a dozen spiral cords on the body whorl forming a scabrous pattern of lamellae which develop into two minor spines on the lower side of the aperture. The aperture is subquadrangular, with the outer lip incised at the insertions of spines, and the inner lip reflected over the columella. The siphonal canal is long and angled.

The ground color is white, with pink vertical bands leading between each major subsutural spine and its corresponding first minor spine underneath. The spines typically have pink apices.

B. neocaledonicus resembles B. spinosus and its allies in terms of its coloration and strong triangular spines, but B. neocaledonicus can be distinguished by its larger size and low spire. B. neocaledonicus also resembles B. purpuratus, but differs primarily in its scaly teleoconch sculpture and narrower, less foliate spines.

== Distribution ==
This marine species occurs off southern New Caledonia and on the Norfolk Ridge, at depths of 200-400 m.
