= Mawae =

Mawae may refer to:

- Mawae, a dialect of the Zia language of Morobe Province, Papua New Guinea
- Kevin Mawae (born 1971), American football coach and former player
- Mawae Gate, a mountain pass in Hawaii
- Latiaxis mawae, a species of sea snail

== See also ==
- Mawai (disambiguation)
