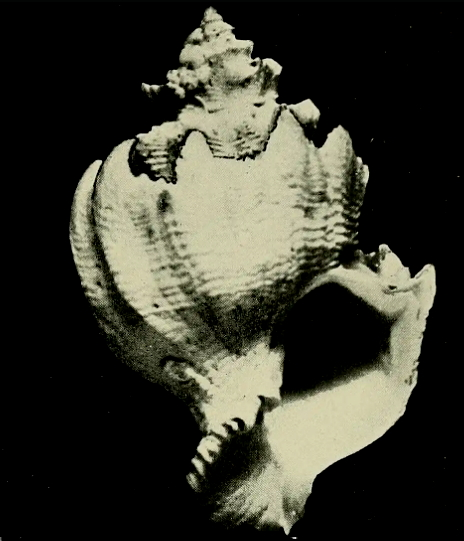
- Shell of Babelomurex capensis (holotype)

Scientific classification
- Kingdom: Animalia
- Phylum: Mollusca
- Class: Gastropoda
- Subclass: Caenogastropoda
- Order: Neogastropoda
- Superfamily: Muricoidea
- Family: Muricidae
- Subfamily: Coralliophilinae
- Genus: Babelomurex
- Species: B. capensis

Binomial name
- Babelomurex capensis (Tomlin, 1928)

Synonyms
- Latiaxis capensis Tomlin, 1928

= Babelomurex capensis =

Species of gastropod

Babelomurex capensis is a species of sea snail, a marine gastropod mollusk, in the family Muricidae, the murex snails or rock snails.

== Description ==
(Original description) This white shell is of the Babelomurex deburghiae type, though it is smaller and more compact, featuring the laminated processes of a coronet that point upwards and gradually recurve over the subsutural area.

The shell is turreted, consisting of a protoconch of about two whorls alongside six other whorls. A series of triangular laminae encircles the shoulder of each whorl, numbering about ten on both the last and the penultimate whorls, which leaves a sort of parapet between them and the suture. These laminae continue downwards across the whorl as obtuse, irregular, and rather inconspicuous ridges. The entire shell is spirally ridged from the periphery upwards, while below the periphery, the spirals become much broader and flatter.

The shell features a funnel-shaped umbilicus, and the columella is prolonged around it on the side away from the aperture in an arcuate series of imbricated scales. The siphonal canal is narrow, recurved, and measures 3 mm in length. The aperture is rather small, measuring 8 mm by 5 mm.

In terms of overall dimensions, the total length is 21 mm, and the maximum diameter is 13 mm.

== Distribution ==
This marine species occurs off Natal, South Africa
