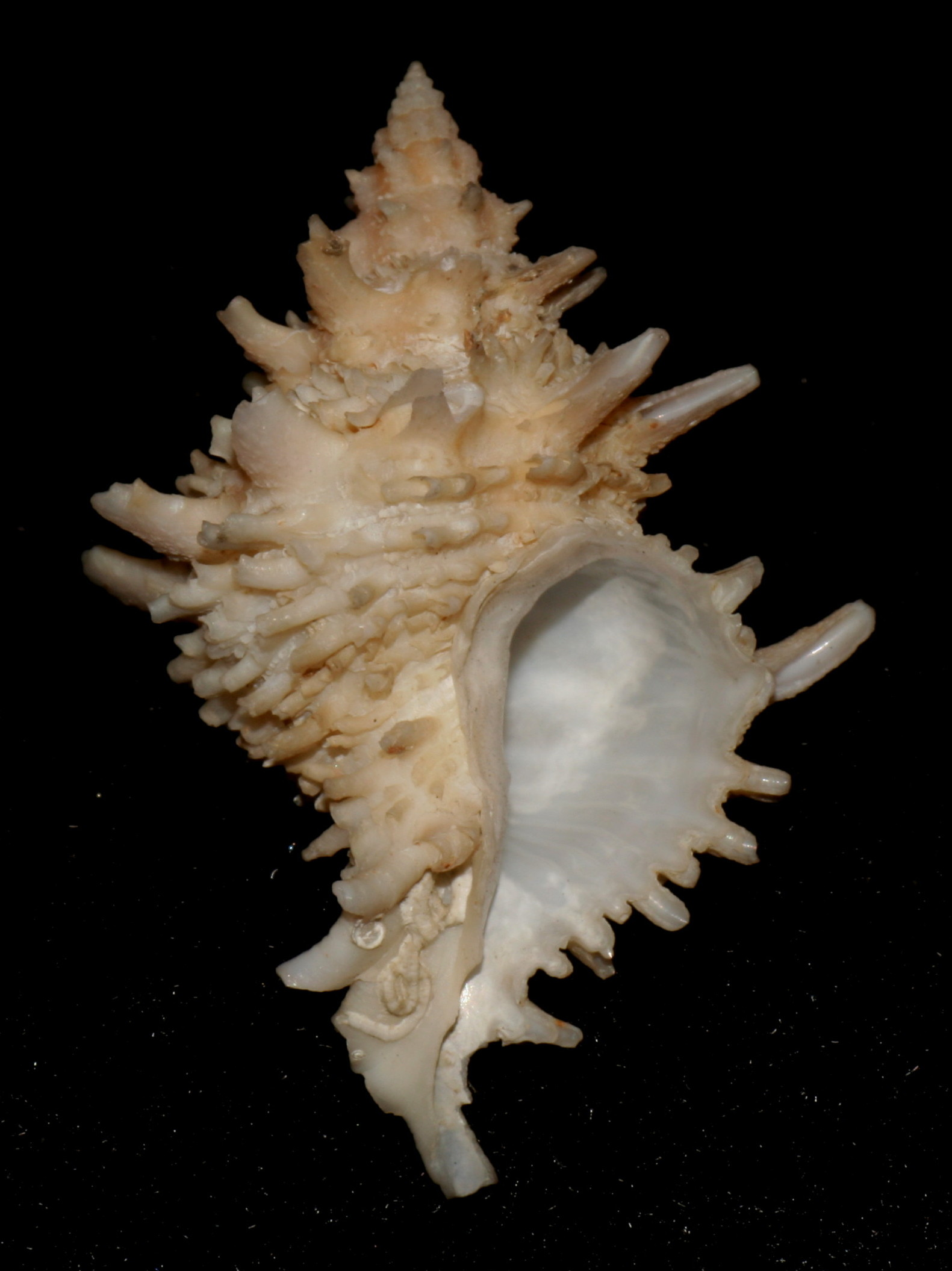
- Shell of Babelomurex tosanus (Hirase, 1908), measuring 36.8 mm in length, dredged at 50 fathoms off Tosa Bay, Shikoku, in Japan

Scientific classification
- Kingdom: Animalia
- Phylum: Mollusca
- Class: Gastropoda
- Subclass: Caenogastropoda
- Order: Neogastropoda
- Family: Muricidae
- Genus: Babelomurex
- Species: B. tosanus

Binomial name
- Babelomurex tosanus (Hirase, 1908)

Synonyms
- Latiaxis tosanus Y. Hirase, 1908 (original combination)

= Babelomurex tosanus =

Species of gastropod

Babelomurex tosanus is a species of sea snail, which is a marine gastropod mollusc in the family Muricidae, the murex or rock snails.

== Description ==
The length of the shell attains 29 mm, its diameter 17.5 mm.

(Original description) The dull yellowish-white shell resembles Babelomurex japonicus (Dunker, R.W., 1882), but is noticeably smaller, with a shorter spire and narrower shoulder appendages. These appendages are tinted a pale rose color and do not extend continuously to their base. The sculpture consists of spiral ribs bearing small spines, unlike B. japonicus, in which the dentate spiral lamellae lack spines. On the body whorl there are four to five ribs above the periphery and six below it, occasionally accompanied by smaller intercalated ribs, while the entire surface is covered with fine striae. The shell comprises seven to eight whorls, although the protoconch is missing. The aperture is semicircular, with a thin outer lip and a free columellar lip. The inner surface of the outer lip bears eleven revolving plicae.

Its color is white or pale brown. It has spines in two configurations. In the first type, each spine on the shoulder is wide and expands vertically. In the other, each spine on the shoulder is thin, long and expands diagonally. It resembles Babelomurex nakayasui, but its body whorl is weak and each spine on the body whorl expands in an irregular direction.

== Distribution ==
It is found in Hawaii, South Africa, Taiwan, Japan, New Caledonia and the southwest Pacific.
