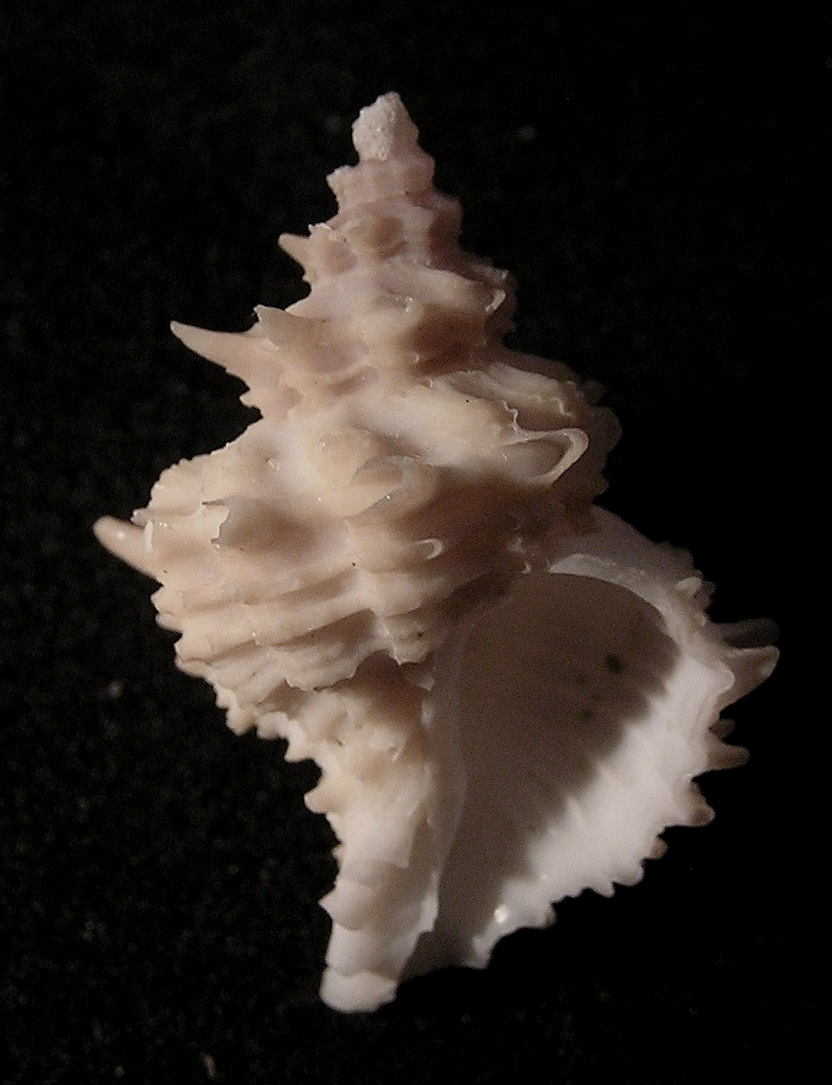
- Apertural view of Babelomurex cariniferus

Conservation status
- Near Threatened (IUCN 2.3)

Scientific classification
- Kingdom: Animalia
- Phylum: Mollusca
- Class: Gastropoda
- Subclass: Caenogastropoda
- Order: Neogastropoda
- Family: Muricidae
- Genus: Babelomurex
- Species: B. cariniferus

Binomial name
- Babelomurex cariniferus (G.B. Sowerby II, 1834)

Synonyms
- Babelomurex (Babelomurex) babelis Réquien, E., 1848; Babelomurex (Babelomurex) bozzetti Kosuge, S., 1994; Babelomurex spinulosus Costa, O.G., 1861; Coralliophila babelis Requien; Coralliophila carinata Koroneos, 1979; Coralliophila lacerata (Deshayes, 1856); Coralliophila lacerata var. piruloides Martens, 1876 (dubious synonym); Fusus babelis Requien, 1848; Fusus babelis var. regalis Requien, 1848; Latiaxis babelis (Requien, 1848) (junior synonym); Latiaxis cariniferus (G.B.Sowerby I, 1834) (currently placed in genus Babelomurex); Latiaxis elegans Angas, 1878; Murex cariniferus G.B. Sowerby II, 1834; Murex laceratum Deshayes, 1856 (dubious synonym); Pseudomurex minor Monterosato, T.A. de M. di, 1872; Purpura gravesii Broderip, 1837

= Babelomurex cariniferus =

Species of gastropod

Babelomurex cariniferus, common name Babel's latiaxis, is a species of sea snail, a marine gastropod mollusc in the family Muricidae, the murex snails or rock snails.

== Distribution ==
Babelomurex cariniferus is present from the Mediterranean Sea to the west coast of Africa (Canaries, Cape Verde, Angola).

This species (as junior synonym Latiaxis babelis) is listed in the IUCN Red List, because it is thought to be endemic to Malta.

== Habitat ==
These sea snails live in the coral reef among corals and sponges. They can be found from a few meters to more than 1000.

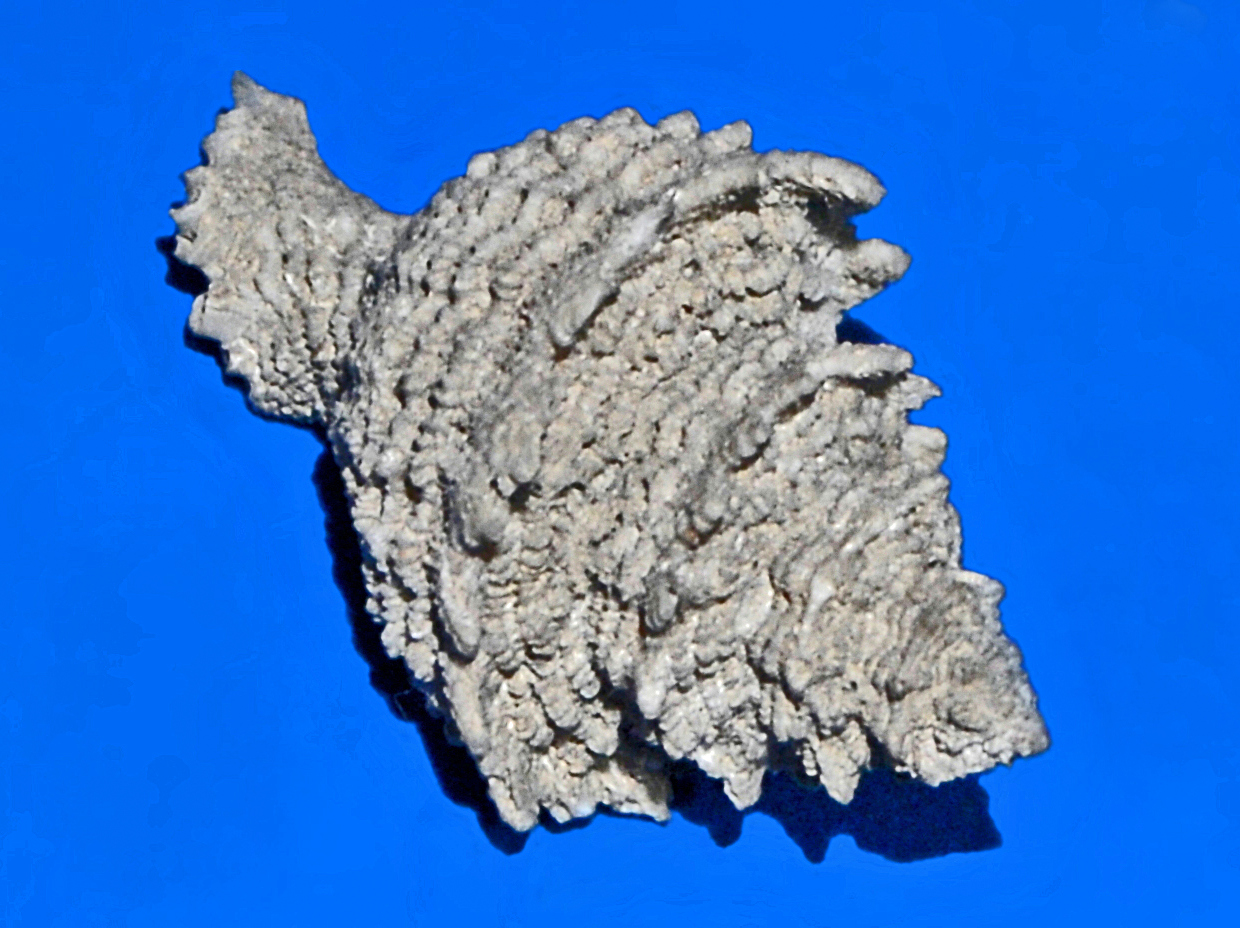
A shell of Babelomurex cariniferus from Sicily

== Description ==
Shells of Babelomurex cariniferus can reach a size of 20–45 millimetres (0.79–1.77 in). The shell surface may be whitish or dark greyish. These shells are variably shaped. They show numerous flattened spires with very thorny axial ribs. The keels of the whorls are adorned with several spiniform scales. A corneous operculum is present.

This species is quite similar to Babelomurex benoiti, but Babelomurex cariniferus is more variable in feature and sculpture and differs in the number of spiniform scales.

== Biology ==
These uncommon infralittoral sea snails are specialist feeders. In fact they feed exclusively on the polyps of the colonies of scleractinian stony corals.

== Bibliography ==
- Cossignani T. (2010) Validazione di Babelomurex tectumsinensis (Deshayes, 1856). Malacologia Mostra Mondiale 66: 19
- Emilio Rolan - Malacological Fauna from the Cape Verde Archipelago
- Gofas, S.; Afonso, J.P.; Brandào, M. (Ed.). (S.a.). Conchas e Moluscos de Angola = Coquillages et Mollusques d'Angola. [Shells and molluscs of Angola]. Universidade Agostinho / Elf Aquitaine Angola: Angola. 140 pp.
- Gofas, S.; Le Renard, J.; Bouchet, P. (2001). Mollusca, in: Costello, M.J. et al. (Ed.) (2001). European register of marine species: a check-list of the marine species in Europe and a bibliography of guides to their identification. Collection Patrimoines Naturels, 50: pp. 180–213
- Repetto G., Orlando F. & Arduino G. (2005): Conchiglie del Mediterraneo, Amici del Museo "Federico Eusebio", Alba, Italy
