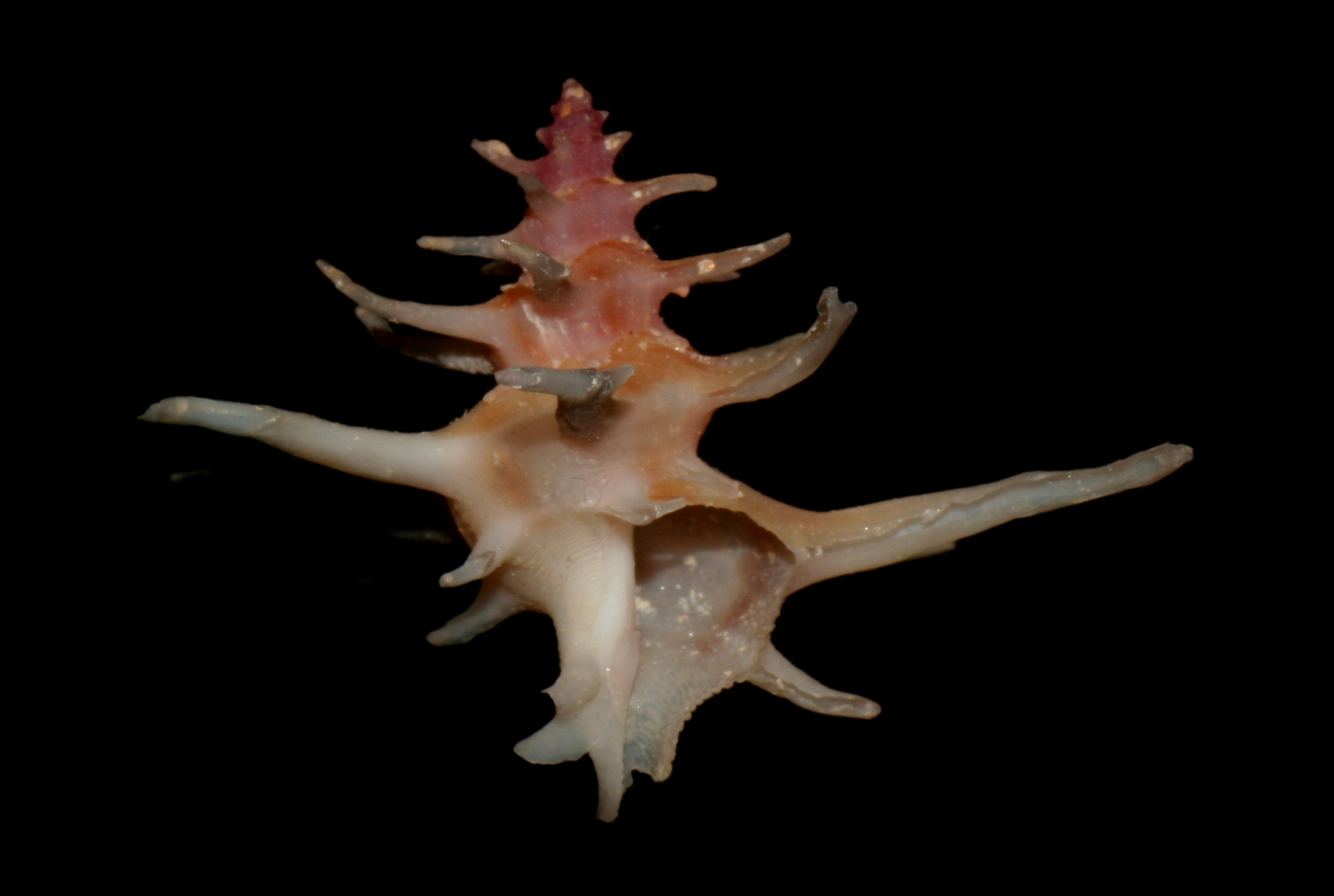
- A shell of Babelomurex fruticosus (Kosuge, 1979), 18.9 mm in length, taken at 80 fathoms in tangle nets off Panglao, Bohol Island, in the Philippines.

Scientific classification
- Kingdom: Animalia
- Phylum: Mollusca
- Class: Gastropoda
- Subclass: Caenogastropoda
- Order: Neogastropoda
- Family: Muricidae
- Genus: Babelomurex
- Species: B. fruticosus

Binomial name
- Babelomurex fruticosus (Kosuge, 1979)

Synonyms
- Latiaxis (Laevilatiaxis) fruticosus Kosuge, 1979 alternative representation; Latiaxis fruticosus Kosuge, 1979 superseded combination

= Babelomurex fruticosus =

Species of gastropod

Babelomurex fruticosus is a species of sea snail, a marine gastropod mollusc in the family Muricidae, the murex snails or rock snails.

Subspecies Babelomurex fruticosus gemmatus (Shikama, 1966): synonym of Babelomurex gemmatus (Shikama, 1966)

== Distribution ==
This marine species occurs off the Philippines.
