= Latiaxis naskensis =

Scientific classification
- Kingdom: Animalia
- Phylum: Mollusca
- Class: Gastropoda
- Subclass: Caenogastropoda
- Order: Neogastropoda
- Superfamily: Muricoidea
- Family: Muricidae
- Subfamily: Coralliophilinae
- Genus: Latiaxis
- Species: L. naskensis

Binomial name
- Latiaxis naskensis Kantor & Sysoev, 1992

Synonyms
- Latiaxis (Babelomurex) naskensis Kantor & Sysoev, 1992

Species of gastropod

Latiaxis naskensis is a species of sea snail, a marine gastropod mollusk, in the family Muricidae, the murex snails or rock snails.
