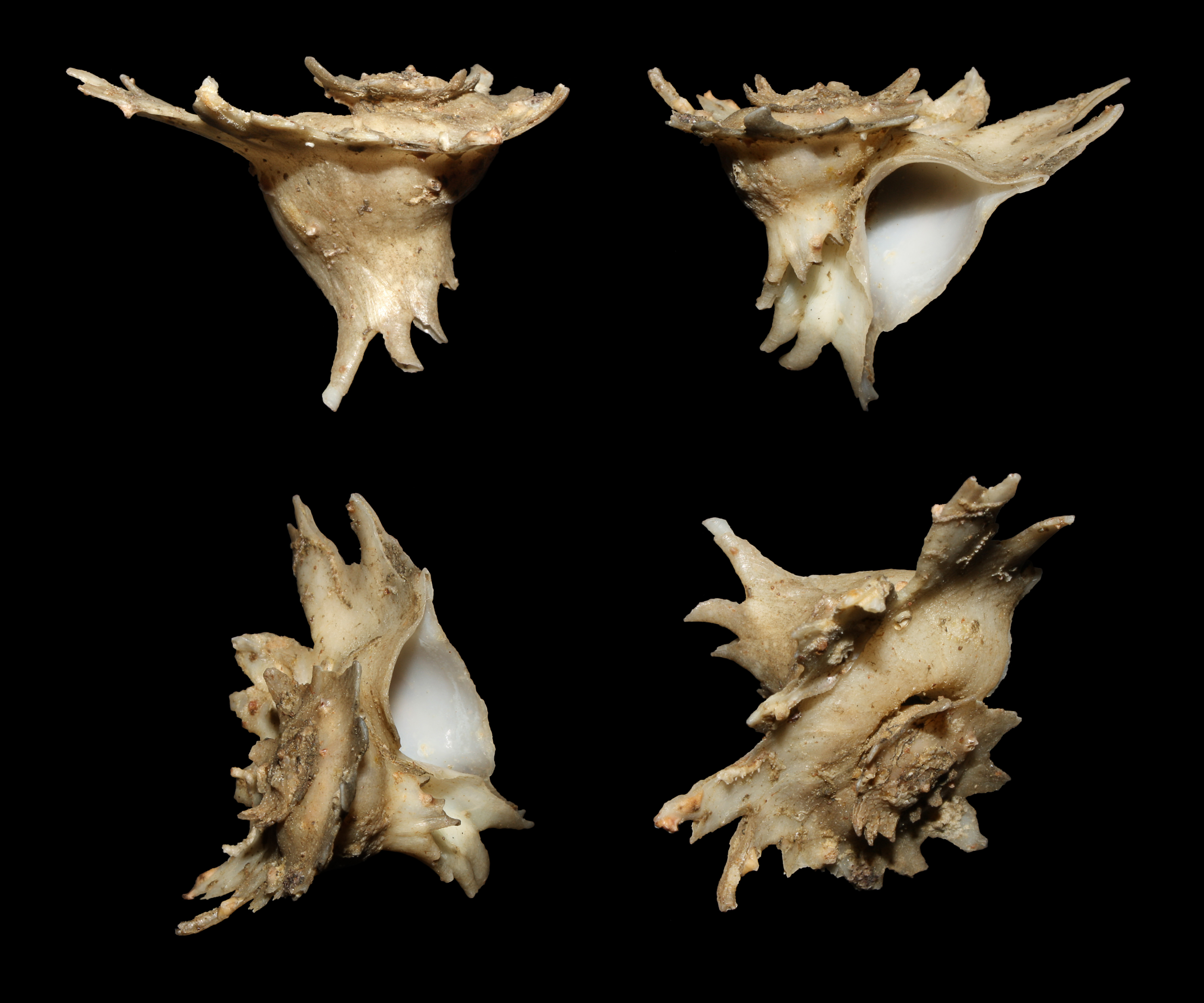
- Shell of Latiaxis pilsbryi Hirase, 1908, height 28 mm, locality unknown.

Scientific classification
- Kingdom: Animalia
- Phylum: Mollusca
- Class: Gastropoda
- Subclass: Caenogastropoda
- Order: Neogastropoda
- Family: Muricidae
- Genus: Latiaxis
- Species: L. pilsbryi

Binomial name
- Latiaxis pilsbryi Hirase, 1908

= Latiaxis pilsbryi =

Species of mollusc

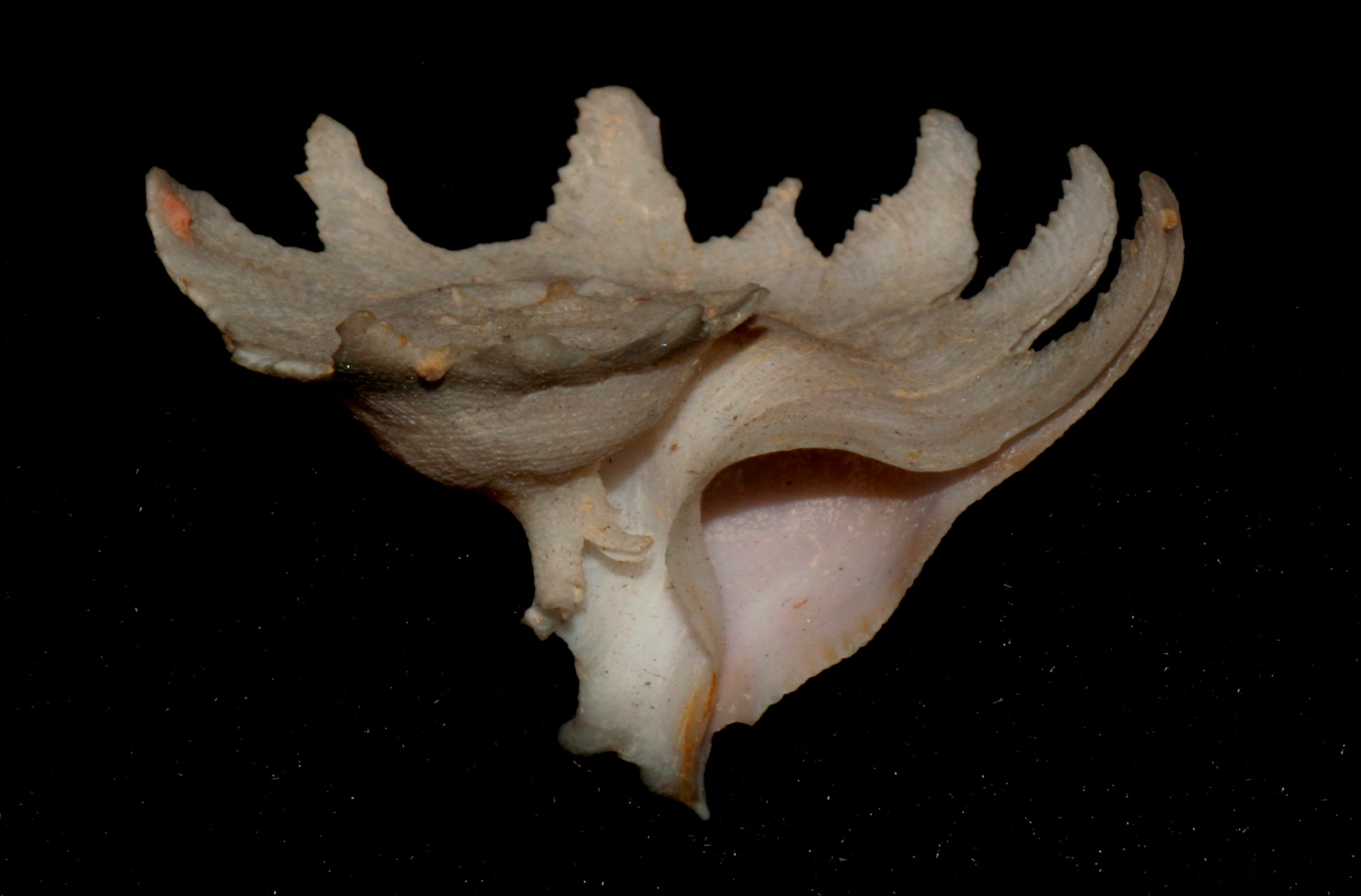
Shell of Latiaxis pilsbryi Hirase, 1908, measuring 23.5 mm in length, taken at 80 fathoms in tangle nets off Cebu Island in the Philippines.

Latiaxis pilsbryi is a species of sea snail, a marine gastropod mollusk in the family Muricidae, the murex snails or rock snails.
