= Latiaxis hayashii =

Scientific classification
- Kingdom: Animalia
- Phylum: Mollusca
- Class: Gastropoda
- Subclass: Caenogastropoda
- Order: Neogastropoda
- Superfamily: Muricoidea
- Family: Muricidae
- Subfamily: Coralliophilinae
- Genus: Latiaxis
- Species: L. hayashii

Binomial name
- Latiaxis hayashii Shikama, 1966

Species of gastropod

Latiaxis hayashii is a species of sea snail, a marine gastropod mollusk, in the family Muricidae, the murex snails or rock snails.
