= Latiaxis cerinamarumai =

Scientific classification
- Kingdom: Animalia
- Phylum: Mollusca
- Class: Gastropoda
- Subclass: Caenogastropoda
- Order: Neogastropoda
- Superfamily: Muricoidea
- Family: Muricidae
- Subfamily: Coralliophilinae
- Genus: Latiaxis
- Species: L. cerinamarumai

Binomial name
- Latiaxis cerinamarumai Kosuge, 1980

Synonyms
- Latiaxis (Echinolatiaxis) cerinamarumai Kosuge, 1980

Species of gastropod

Latiaxis cerinamarumai is a species of sea snail, a marine gastropod mollusk, in the family Muricidae, the murex snails or rock snails.
