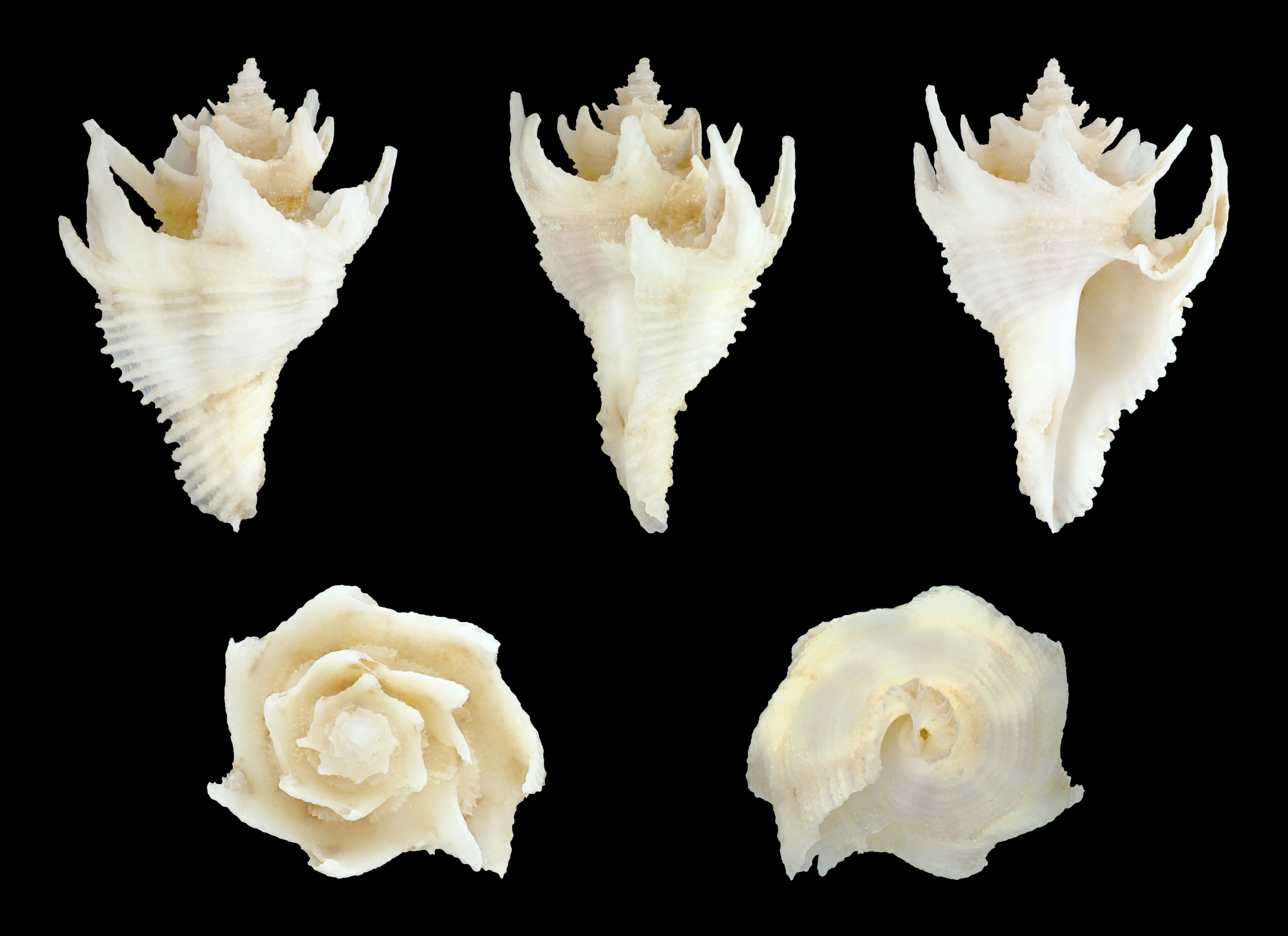
- Five views of a shell of Babelomurex japonicus

Scientific classification
- Kingdom: Animalia
- Phylum: Mollusca
- Class: Gastropoda
- Subclass: Caenogastropoda
- Order: Neogastropoda
- Family: Muricidae
- Genus: Babelomurex
- Species: B. japonicus

Binomial name
- Babelomurex japonicus (Dunker, R.W., 1882)

Synonyms
- Latiaxis japonicus (Dunker, 1882); Latiaxis sallei Jousseaume, 1884; Rapana japonica Dunker, R.W., 1882 (basionym)

= Babelomurex japonicus =

Species of gastropod

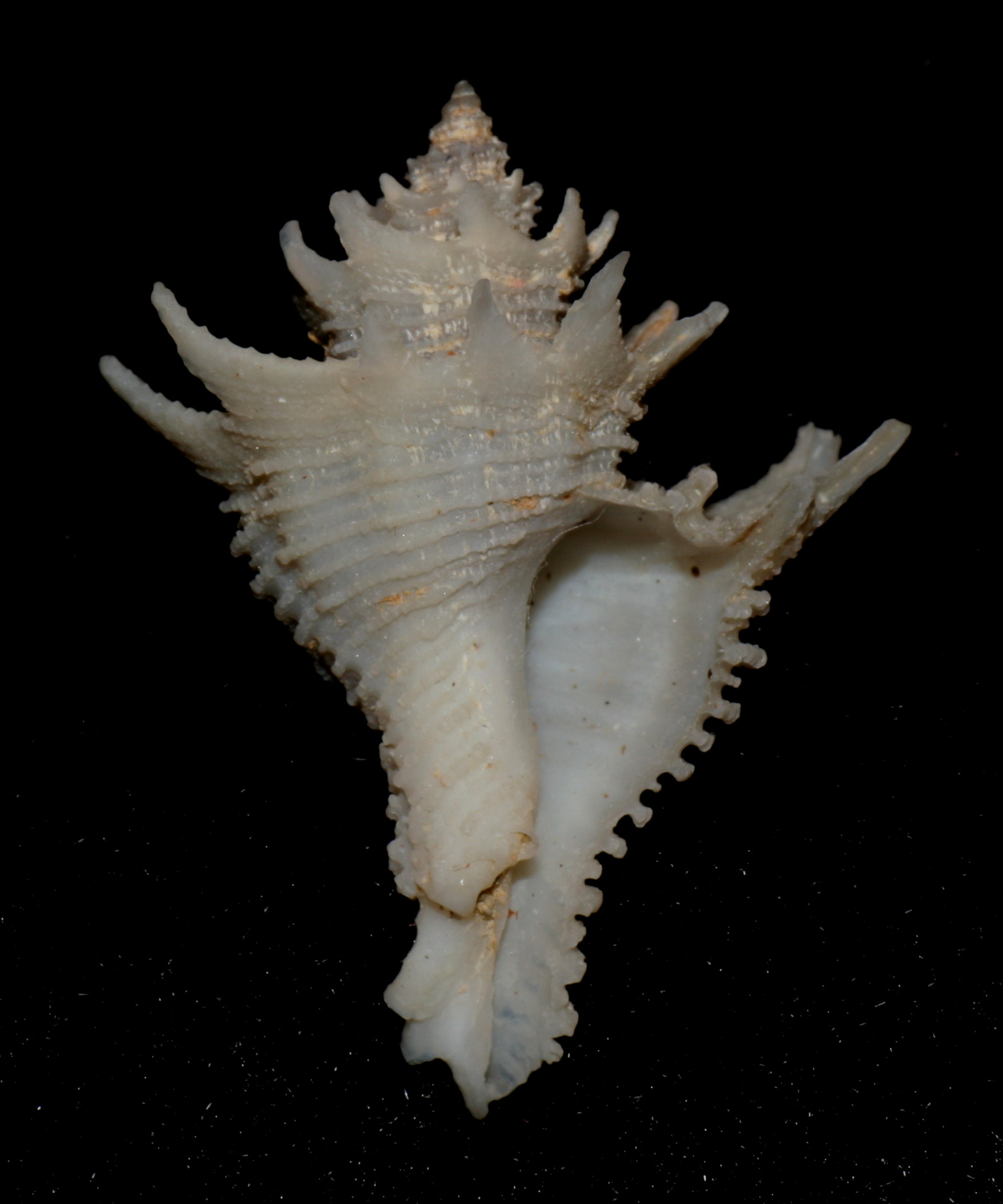
An apertural view of a shell of Babelomurex japonicus (Dunker, 1882), 25.9 mm, taken at 80 fathoms in tangle nets off Panglao, Bohol Island in the Philippines.

Babelomurex japonicus, common name the Japanese latiaxis, is a species of sea snail, a marine gastropod mollusc in the family Muricidae, the murex snails or rock snails.

== Description ==
The length of the shell varies between 25 mm and 50 mm.

(Original description in Latin) The shell is fusiform and milk-white, consisting of eight whorls. These whorls are equipped with equal, dense, and narrow ribs that are minutely overlapping, as well as a double row of large scales that occupies the upper part of the whorls. The aperture is ovate. The outer lip is ribbed on the inside, while the columella is very slightly sinuous. The rostrum is straight, and the siphonal canal is open.

With respect to its ribs and scales, this shell is analogous to Babelomurex lischkeanus (Dunker, 1882), but it differs sufficiently to be regarded as a distinct, genuine species. Indeed, it differs not only in having equal, narrower, and higher ribs—which are therefore more clearly defined—but also in possessing a double rather than a single row of large scales occupying the upper part of the whorls. Furthermore, these scales are not smooth, but are striated and minutely serrated on the right side (that is, the back).

== Distribution ==
This marine species is found in the following countries, Japan, the Philippines,Hawaii, New Caledonia, Tonga Islands and Vanuatu.
