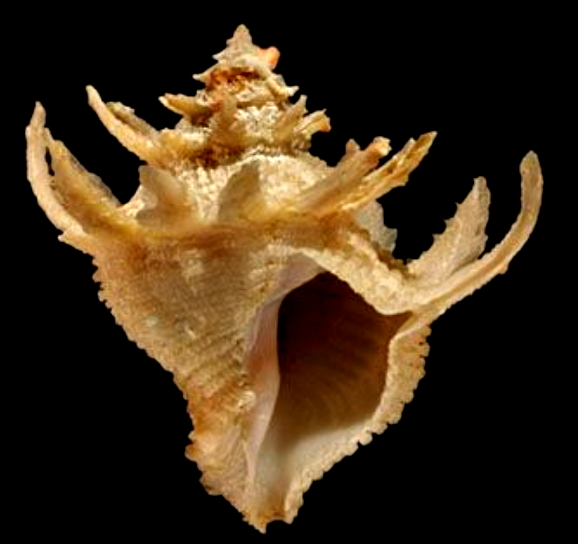
- Shell of Babelomurex purpuratus (specimen at the Natural History Museum, Rotterdam)

Scientific classification
- Kingdom: Animalia
- Phylum: Mollusca
- Class: Gastropoda
- Subclass: Caenogastropoda
- Order: Neogastropoda
- Family: Muricidae
- Genus: Babelomurex
- Species: B. purpuratus

Binomial name
- Babelomurex purpuratus (Chenu, 1859)

Synonyms
- Latiaxis purpurata Chenu, 1859 · > superseded combination

= Babelomurex purpuratus =

Species of gastropod

Babelomurex purpuratus is a species of sea snail, a marine gastropod mollusc in the family Muricidae, the murex snails or rock snails.

== Description ==
The length of the shell attains 22 mm.

== Distribution ==
This marine species occurs off the Philippines.
