= Babelomurex tumidus =

Scientific classification
- Kingdom: Animalia
- Phylum: Mollusca
- Class: Gastropoda
- Subclass: Caenogastropoda
- Order: Neogastropoda
- Superfamily: Muricoidea
- Family: Muricidae
- Subfamily: Coralliophilinae
- Genus: Babelomurex
- Species: B. tumidus

Binomial name
- Babelomurex tumidus (Kosuge, 1980)

Synonyms
- Latiaxis (Babelomurex) tumidus Kosuge, 1980; Latiaxis tumidus Kosuge, 1980

Species of gastropod

Babelomurex tumidus is a species of sea snail, a marine gastropod mollusk, in the family Muricidae, the murex snails or rock snails.

== Distribution ==
This marine species occurs off Japan, Taiwan, the Philippines and New Caledonia (on the Norfolk Ridge).
