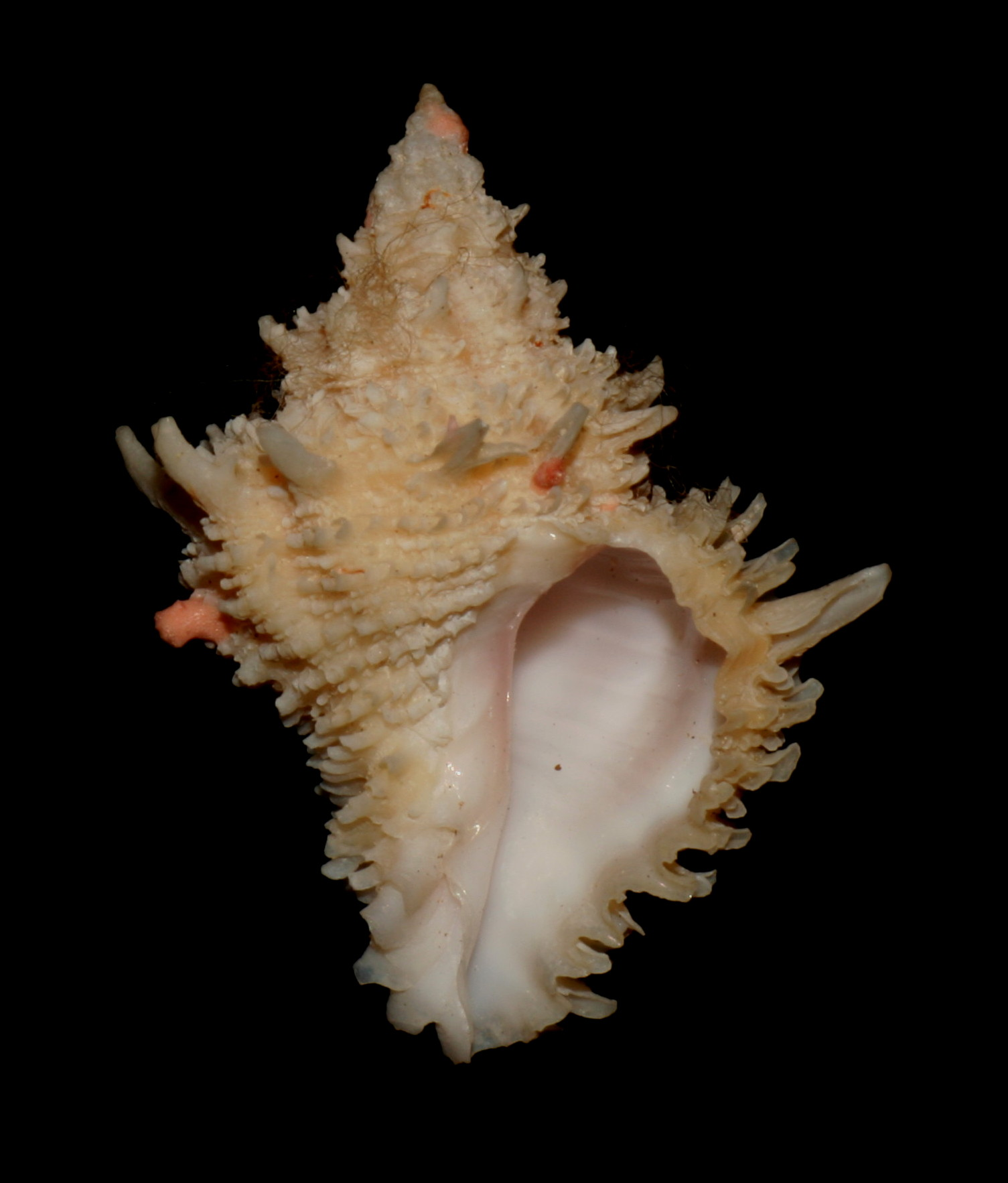
- Shell of Hirtomurex winckworthi (Fulton, 1930), measuring 22.7 mm, trawled in deep water in the Philippines.

Scientific classification
- Kingdom: Animalia
- Phylum: Mollusca
- Class: Gastropoda
- Subclass: Caenogastropoda
- Order: Neogastropoda
- Family: Muricidae
- Genus: Hirtomurex
- Species: H. winckworthi

Binomial name
- Hirtomurex winckworthi (Fulton, 1930)

Synonyms
- Latiaxis translucida Kosuge, 1981; Latiaxis winckworthi Fulton, 1930 (basionym)

= Hirtomurex winckworthi =

Species of gastropod

Hirtomurex winckworthi is a species of sea snail, a marine gastropod mollusc in the family Muricidae, the murex snails or rock snails.
