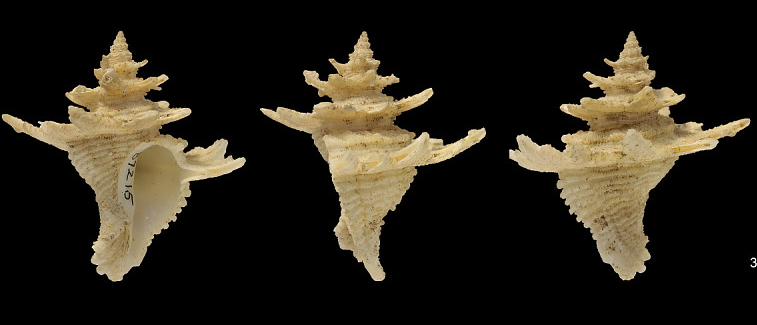
- Shell of Babelomurex dalli (Specimen at the Smithsonian Institution)

Scientific classification
- Kingdom: Animalia
- Phylum: Mollusca
- Class: Gastropoda
- Subclass: Caenogastropoda
- Order: Neogastropoda
- Family: Muricidae
- Genus: Babelomurex
- Species: B. dalli

Binomial name
- Babelomurex dalli (Emerson & D'Attilio 1963)

Synonyms
- Coralliophila deburghiae auct.: Dall (1889a, b); Springer and Bullis (1956), non Reeve,1857; Coralliophila deburghiae var. fusiformis Dall, 1889: 219 (synonymy uncertain); Coralliophila deburghiae var. spinosa Dall, 1889; Latiaxis dalli Emerson and D’Attilio, 1963

= Babelomurex dalli =

Species of gastropod

Babelomurex dalli is a species of sea snail, a marine gastropod mollusc in the family Muricidae, the murex snails or rock snails.

== Distribution ==
This species occurs in the Western Atlantic, from Southern Florida to the Bahamas Islands and Guadeloupe; Central North Atlantic, Great Meteor Seamount, rare in 300-335 m. .
