= Babelomurex filialis =

Scientific classification
- Kingdom: Animalia
- Phylum: Mollusca
- Class: Gastropoda
- Subclass: Caenogastropoda
- Order: Neogastropoda
- Family: Muricidae
- Genus: Babelomurex
- Species: B. filialis

Binomial name
- Babelomurex filialis (Shikama, 1978)

Synonyms
- Latiaxis (Tolema) filiaris Shikama, 1978 superseded combination; Latiaxis filiaris Shikama, 1978 superseded combination

Species of gastropod

Babelomurex filialis is a species of sea snail, a marine gastropod mollusc in the family Muricidae, the murex snails or rock snails.

== Distribution ==
This marine species occurs off Taiwan.
