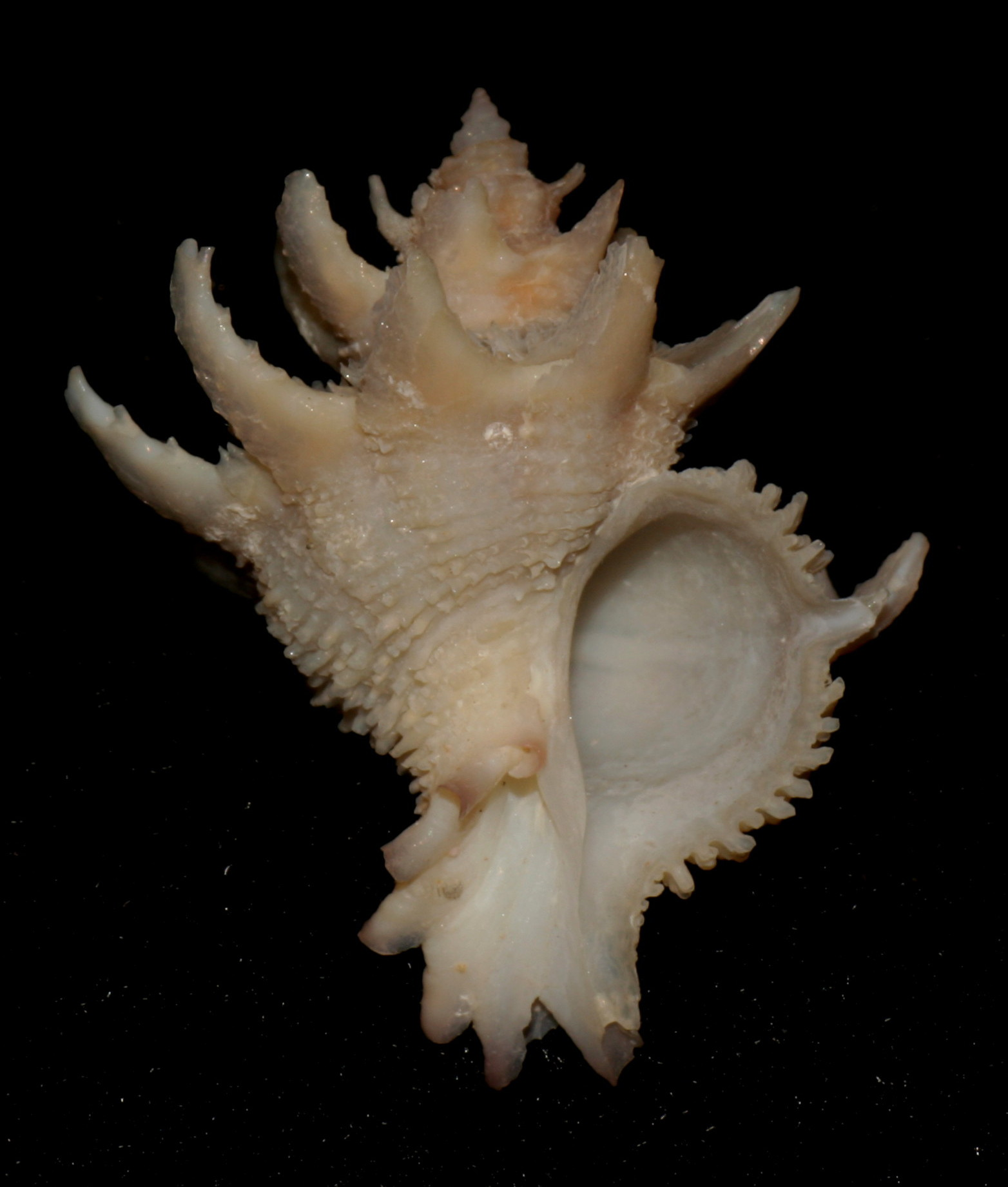
- A shell of Babelomurex armatus Sowerby III, 1912, 30.6 mm in length, trawled at 180 to 300 m, in the South China Sea.

Scientific classification
- Kingdom: Animalia
- Phylum: Mollusca
- Class: Gastropoda
- Subclass: Caenogastropoda
- Order: Neogastropoda
- Family: Muricidae
- Genus: Babelomurex
- Species: B. armatus

Binomial name
- Babelomurex armatus Sowerby III, 1912

Synonyms
- Latiaxis armatus G. B. Sowerby III, 1912 (original combination)

= Babelomurex armatus =

Species of gastropod

Babelomurex armatus is a species of sea snail, a marine gastropod mollusc in the family Muricidae, the murex snails or rock snails.

== Description ==
The length of the shell attains 28 mm, its diameter 16 mm.

(Original description in Latin) The shell is shortly fusiform and white in color, featuring an sharply pyramidal spire. It consists of eight whorls that are distinctly angulated, densely covered with spiral ridges, and finely squamose (scaly). At their angle, the whorls are muricate (prickly or spinous).

The body whorl slopes down in a somewhat flattened manner above the angle, where it is armed with elongated, narrow scales that rise obliquely. Below this angle, the whorl becomes convex, and it contracts a little below its middle. The umbilicus is narrow and is bordered by a scaly, oblique left ridge. The aperture is oval in shape, the columella is tortuous, and the siphonal canal is moderately produced and slightly arched.

== Distribution ==
This marine species occurs off Japan, Taiwan and the Philippines.
