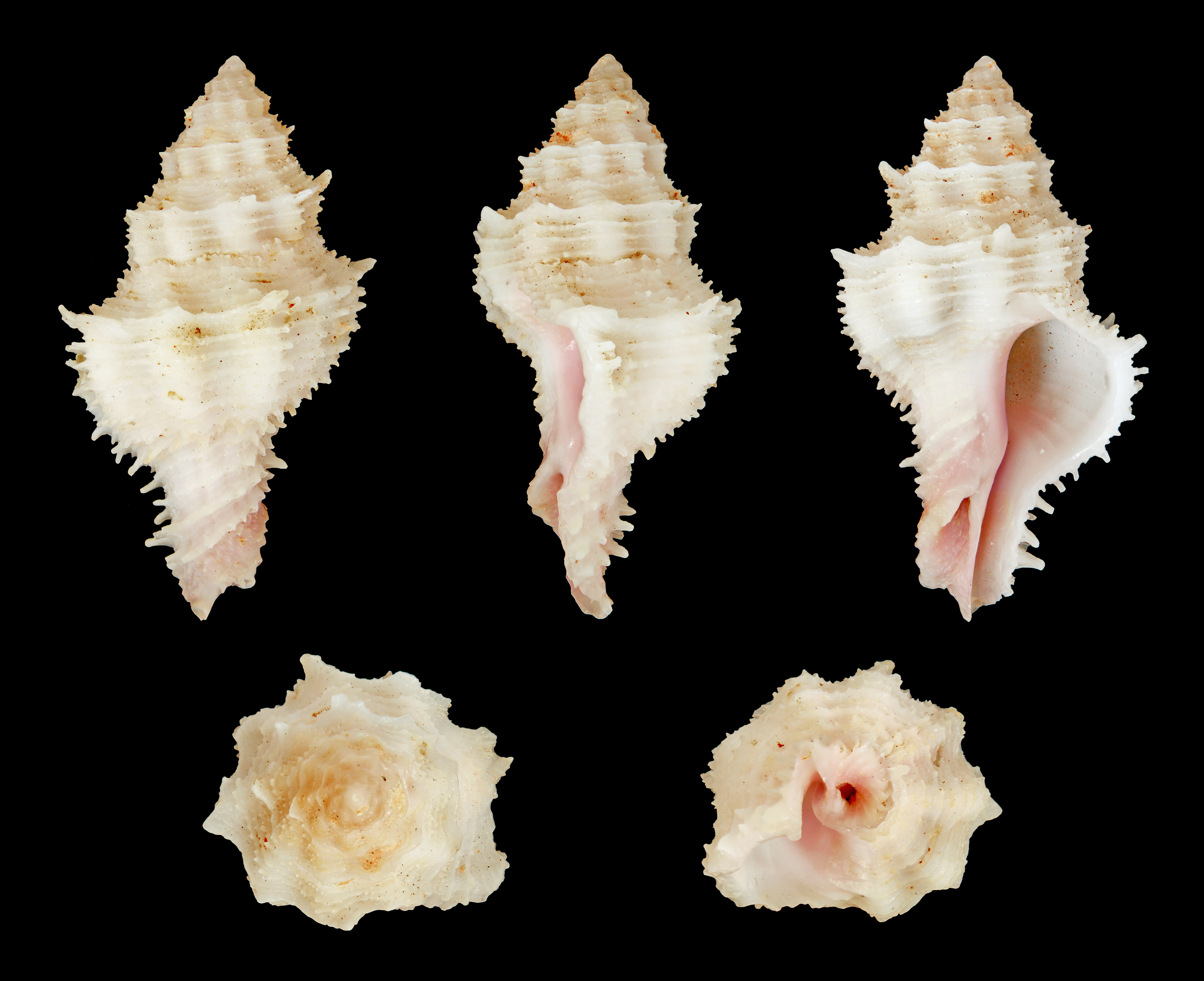
- Different views of a shell of Coralliophila fearnleyi

Scientific classification
- Kingdom: Animalia
- Phylum: Mollusca
- Class: Gastropoda
- Subclass: Caenogastropoda
- Order: Neogastropoda
- Family: Muricidae
- Genus: Coralliophila
- Species: C. fearnleyi

Binomial name
- Coralliophila fearnleyi Emerson & D'Attilio, 1965

Synonyms
- Babelomurex fearnleyi (Emerson & D'Attilio, 1965); Latiaxis fearnleyi Emerson & D'Attilio, 1965 (basionym)

= Coralliophila fearnleyi =

Species of gastropod

Coralliophila fearnleyi is a species of sea snail, a marine gastropod mollusk in the family Muricidae, the murex snails or rock snails.

== Description ==
The length of shell varies between 33 mm and 67 mm.

== Distribution ==
This marine species occurs off India, Japan, and Northern Australia.
