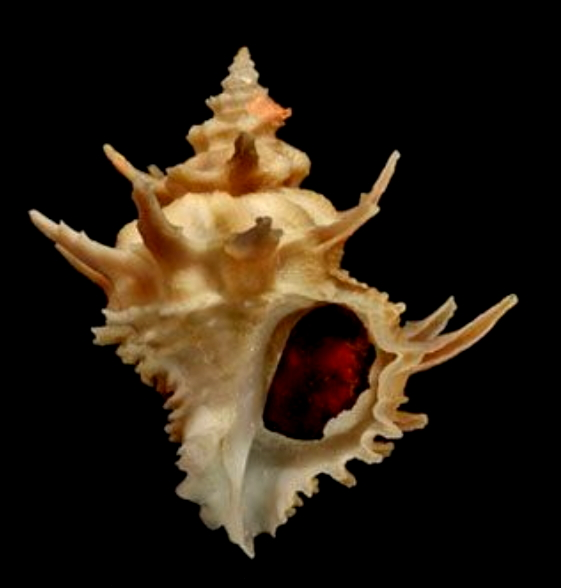
- Shell of Babelomurex diadema (specimen at the Natural History Museum, Rotterdam)

Scientific classification
- Kingdom: Animalia
- Phylum: Mollusca
- Class: Gastropoda
- Subclass: Caenogastropoda
- Order: Neogastropoda
- Family: Muricidae
- Genus: Babelomurex
- Species: B. diadema

Binomial name
- Babelomurex diadema (A. Adams, 1854)

Synonyms
- Latiaxis (Laevilatiaxis) macutanicus Kosuge, 1979 alternative representation; Latiaxis macutanicus Kosuge, 1979; Murex diadema A. Adams, 1854 (original combination); Muricidea diadema (A. Adams, 1854) ·

= Babelomurex diadema =

Species of gastropod

Babelomurex diadema is a species of sea snail, a marine gastropod mollusc in the family Muricidae, the murex snails or rock snails.

== Description ==
(Original description in Latin) The ovate-fusiform shell is umbilicated, and of a flesh-to-tawny coloration. The spire is produced and consists of eight whorls, which are angled in the middle. These whorls are elegantly crowned with curved, somewhat leaf-like spines, and they are adorned with crowded, squamulose transverse ridges. The body whorl is slightly ventricose and is equipped with leaf-like, jagged spines, while it contains anteriorly three transverse, scaly ridges. The aperture is oval. The inner lip is simple and straight, whereas the outer lip is sharp and ridged on the inside. The siphonal canal is open and short, being slightly curved toward the back. Finally, the umbilical region is surrounded by overlapping scales.

== Distribution ==
This marine species occurs off the Philippines; also off New Caledonia, French Polynesia, Vanuatu, Fiji and Japan.
