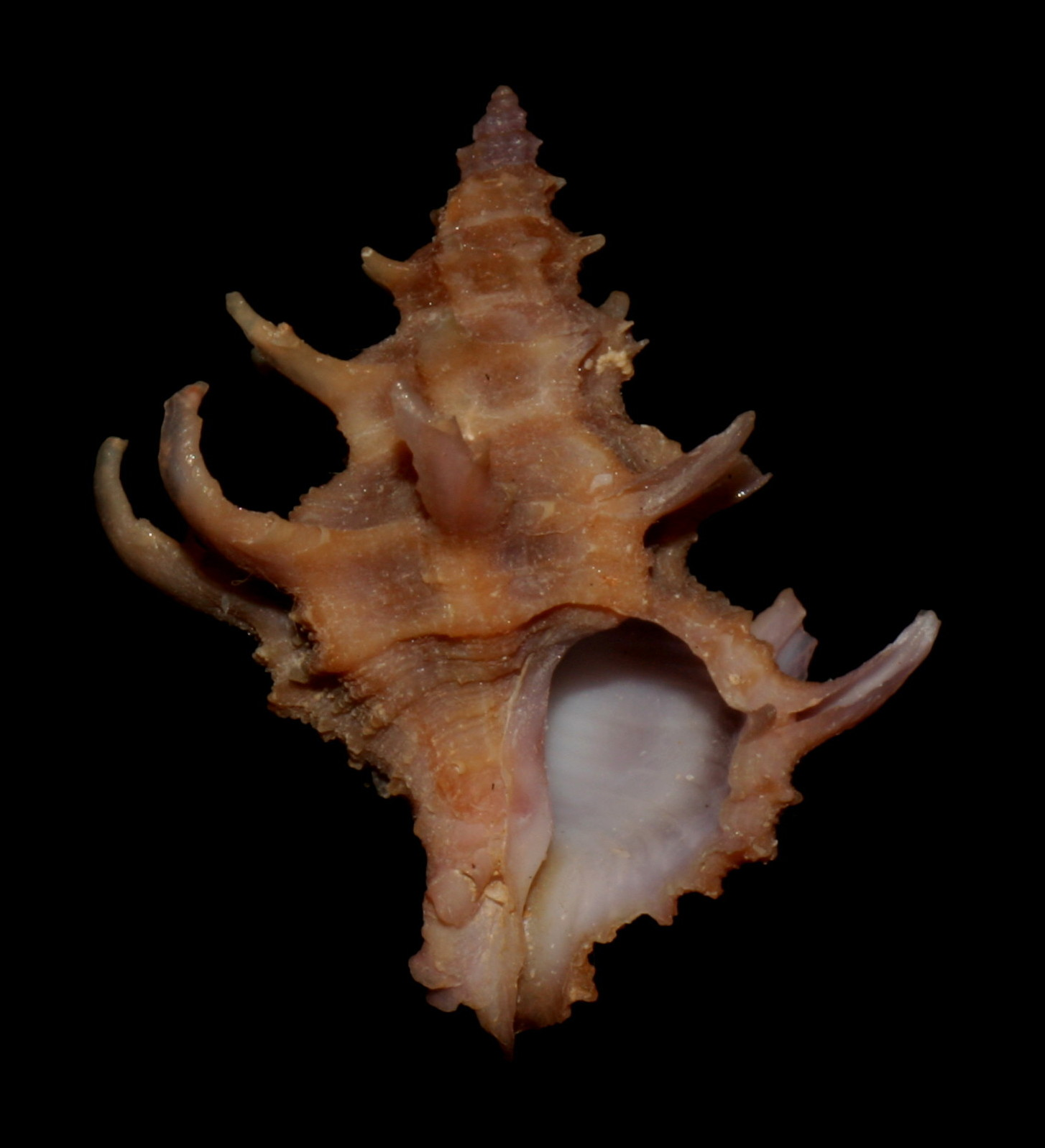
- Shell of Babelomurex princeps (Melville, 1912), measuring 21.2 mm in length, trawled at 75 fathoms off Punta Engano, Mactan Island, in the Philippines

Scientific classification
- Kingdom: Animalia
- Phylum: Mollusca
- Class: Gastropoda
- Subclass: Caenogastropoda
- Order: Neogastropoda
- Family: Muricidae
- Genus: Babelomurex
- Species: B. princeps

Binomial name
- Babelomurex princeps (Melvill, 1912)

Synonyms
- Latiaxis (Babelomurex) castaneotinctus Kosuge, 1980 alternative representation; Latiaxis castaneocinctus Kosuge, 1980; Latiaxis princeps Melvill, 1912 (basionym)

= Babelomurex princeps =

Species of gastropod

Babelomurex princeps is a species of sea snail, a marine gastropod mollusc in the family Muricidae, the murex snails or rock snails.

== Description ==
The shell size varies between 25 mm and 45 mm

(Original description in Latin) The shell is oblong-fusiform and narrowly perforate. It is white or straw-colored, and is occasionally tinted with a pale hyacinth-blue. There are 7 to 8 whorls, of which the 2 apical whorls are minute and glassy. The three whorls immediately following these are spirally adorned with thick nodules and are angled at the middle. The last two whorls are broadly and regularly ornamented at the middle with triangular spines that are recurved, frondose, and scaly. The entire surface of the body whorl is finely striated, and, from below the periphery down to the base, it is decorated with seven spiral, imbricated rows of scales. The aperture is ovate and white. The outer lip is thin and multi-toothed on the exterior. The columella is nearly straight, and the siphonal canal is slightly recurved. The length of the holotype is 37 mm, and the width is 25 mm.

== Distribution ==
This species is distributed in the Persian Gulf, the Indian Ocean along Mauritius and in the Pacific Ocean along the Philippines
