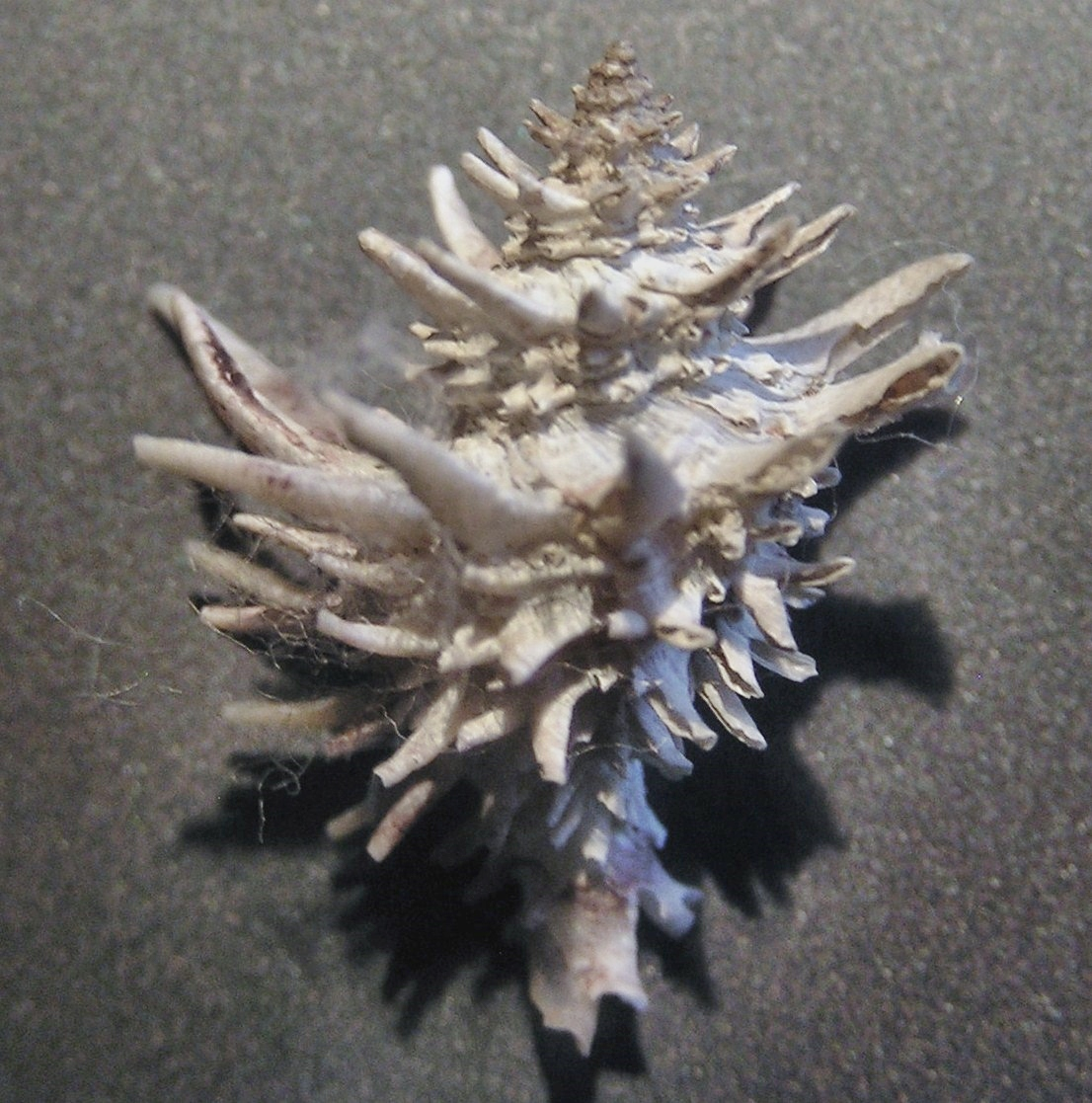

Scientific classification
- Kingdom: Animalia
- Phylum: Mollusca
- Class: Gastropoda
- Subclass: Caenogastropoda
- Order: Neogastropoda
- Family: Muricidae
- Genus: Babelomurex
- Species: B. wormaldi

Binomial name
- Babelomurex wormaldi (Powell, 1971)

Synonyms
- Latiaxis (Echinolatiaxis) fenestratus Kosuge, 1980 (junior subjective synonym); Latiaxis fenestratus Kosuge, 1980; Latiaxis wormaldi Powell, 1971 (basionym)

= Babelomurex wormaldi =

Species of gastropod

Babelomurex wormaldi is a species of medium-sized sea snail, a marine gastropod mollusc in the subfamily Coralliophilinae, the coral snails.

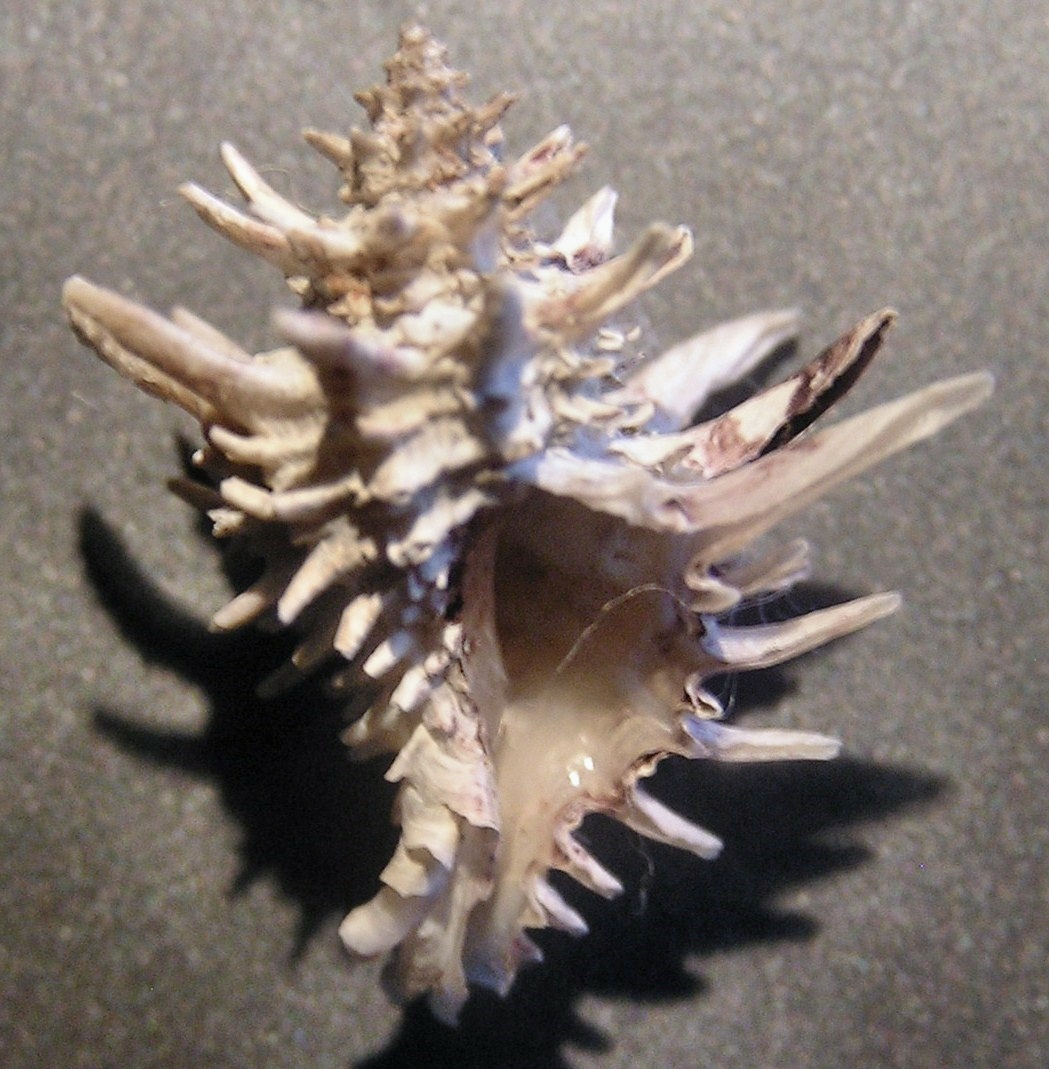
Babelomurex wormaldi, apertural view

== Description ==
The average shell size is 16.7 mm. Specimens typically measure 22.7 mm in height and 19.75 mm in width.

(Original description) The shell is of moderate size and has a broadly biconical shape, featuring a spire that is shorter than the aperture combined with the siphonal canal. Its sculpture consists of sharply raised lamellae, which are coronated at the medial angle into long, upcurved, hollow spines. On the base, there are six spiral ribs, all of which are scabrous or weakly spinose at each lamellose axial intersection. The anterior canal is almost closed and is accompanied by a fasciolar ridge that bears a spinose series of former canals. There are ten coronate spines and axial lamellae on the last whorl.

In color, the shell is a light pinkish-brown, while the spines and lamellae are a pale buff; the interior of the aperture mirrors the light pinkish-brown tone.

== Distribution ==
This species is distributed in the Pacific Ocean off the Philippines and New Zealand; also off New Caledonia, Tonga and the Austral Islands.
