= Babelomurex juliae =

Scientific classification
- Kingdom: Animalia
- Phylum: Mollusca
- Class: Gastropoda
- Subclass: Caenogastropoda
- Order: Neogastropoda
- Superfamily: Muricoidea
- Family: Muricidae
- Subfamily: Coralliophilinae
- Genus: Babelomurex
- Species: B. juliae

Binomial name
- Babelomurex juliae (Clench & Aguayo, 1939)

Synonyms
- Latiaxis juliae Clench & Aguayo, 1939

Species of gastropod

Babelomurex juliae is a species of sea snail, a marine gastropod mollusk, in the family Muricidae, the murex snails or rock snails.

== Distribution ==
It occurs in the Caribbean Sea off Barbados and in the Atlantic Ocean off Brazil.
