= Babelomurex marumai =

Scientific classification
- Kingdom: Animalia
- Phylum: Mollusca
- Class: Gastropoda
- Subclass: Caenogastropoda
- Order: Neogastropoda
- Family: Muricidae
- Genus: Babelomurex
- Species: B. marumai

Binomial name
- Babelomurex marumai Habe & Kosuge, 1970)

Synonyms
- Latiaxis (Lamellatiaxis) marumai T. Habe & Kosuge, 1970 superseded combination; Latiaxis marumai T. Habe & Kosuge, 1970 (superseded combination

Species of gastropod

Babelomurex marumai is a species of sea snail, a marine gastropod mollusc in the family Muricidae, the murex snails or rock snails.

== Distribution ==
This species occurs in the South China Sea; also off Japan and the Philippines.
