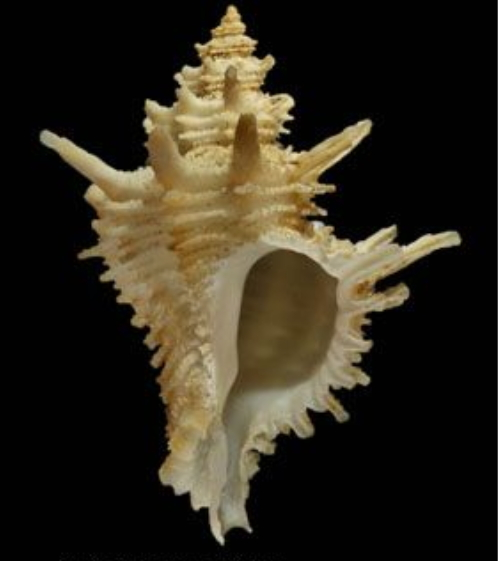
- Shell of Babelomurex indicus (specimen at the Natural History Museum, Rotterdam)

Scientific classification
- Kingdom: Animalia
- Phylum: Mollusca
- Class: Gastropoda
- Subclass: Caenogastropoda
- Order: Neogastropoda
- Family: Muricidae
- Genus: Babelomurex
- Species: B. indicus

Binomial name
- Babelomurex indicus (E.A. Smith, 1899)

Synonyms
- Boreotrophon indicus (E. A. Smith, 1899); Coralliophila indica E. A. Smith, 1899 (original combination); Latiaxis (Babelomurex) kanamarui Shikama, 1978 alternative representation; Latiaxis (Babelomurex) michikoae Shikama, 1978 alternative representation; Latiaxis kanamarui Shikama, 1978 (doubtful synonym); Latiaxis kieneri Hidalgo, 1904 unaccepted (doubtful synonym); Latiaxis kiranus Kuroda, 1959 (doubtful synonym); Latiaxis michikoae Shikama, 1978 (doubtful synonym)

= Babelomurex indicus =

Species of gastropod

Babelomurex indicus is a species of sea snail, a marine gastropod mollusc in the family Muricidae, the murex snails or rock snails.

== Descvription ==
The length of the shell attains 28 mm, its diameter 14 mm.

(Original description in Latin and English) The shell is briefly spindle-shaped and white. It contains about ten longitudinal ribs and very scaly transverse ridges, the scales being prolonged above the ribs. It has four normal whorls, which are angled above the middle, obliquely tubular on the upper part, and slightly convex below. At the angle of the whorls, the scales above the ribs are longer than the others and stand erect upward. The body whorl is constricted below the middle, and in front it is shortly tailed and slit-like.

The aperture is pear-shaped and channelled at the front, with the siphonal canal slightly exceeding one fourth of the total shell length. The columella is rather straight and covered with a thin callus joined to the lip. The lip itself is slightly thickened and ridged within. The anterior canal is oblique and recurved.

In this species, the transverse ridges are densely clothed with close-set scales. Those borne upon the longitudinal ribs are longer than the others, giving the ribs a distinctly frilled appearance. The ridges alternate between stronger and more slender forms, with about three situated above the angulation of the whorl and four below it.

On the body whorl, a broad basal ridge bearing especially large scales forms the rimation. Only fully adult specimens show a thickened outer lip that is lirate within; the internal lirae are rather faint and number approximately eight or nine.

== Distribution ==
This marine species occurs off Japan, Taiwan, the Philippines and in the Bay of Bengal; also off New Caledonia.
