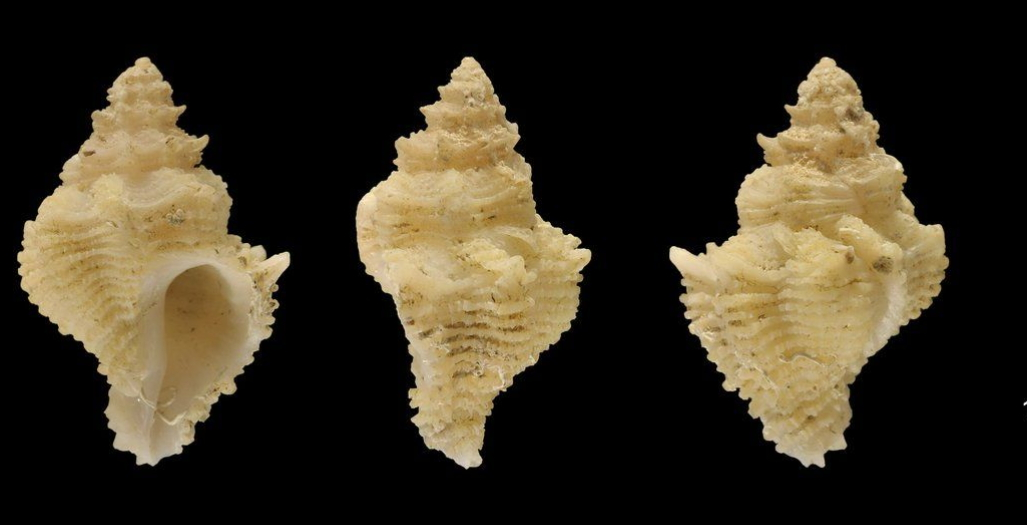
- Shell of Babelomurex spinosus (syntype at the National Museum of Natural History, Smithsonian Institution)

Scientific classification
- Kingdom: Animalia
- Phylum: Mollusca
- Class: Gastropoda
- Subclass: Caenogastropoda
- Order: Neogastropoda
- Family: Muricidae
- Genus: Babelomurex
- Species: B. spinosus

Binomial name
- Babelomurex spinosus (Dall, 1889)

Synonyms
- Coralliophila deburghiae var. spinosa Dall, 1889

= Babelomurex spinosus =

Species of gastropod

Babelomurex spinosus, common name the spiny latiaxis, is a species of sea snail, a marine gastropod mollusc in the family Muricidae, the murex snails or rock snails.

== Description ==
The shell is similar to Babelomurex deburghiae, but the spines are thorn-like and slender.

== Distribution ==
This marine species occurs off Barbados.
