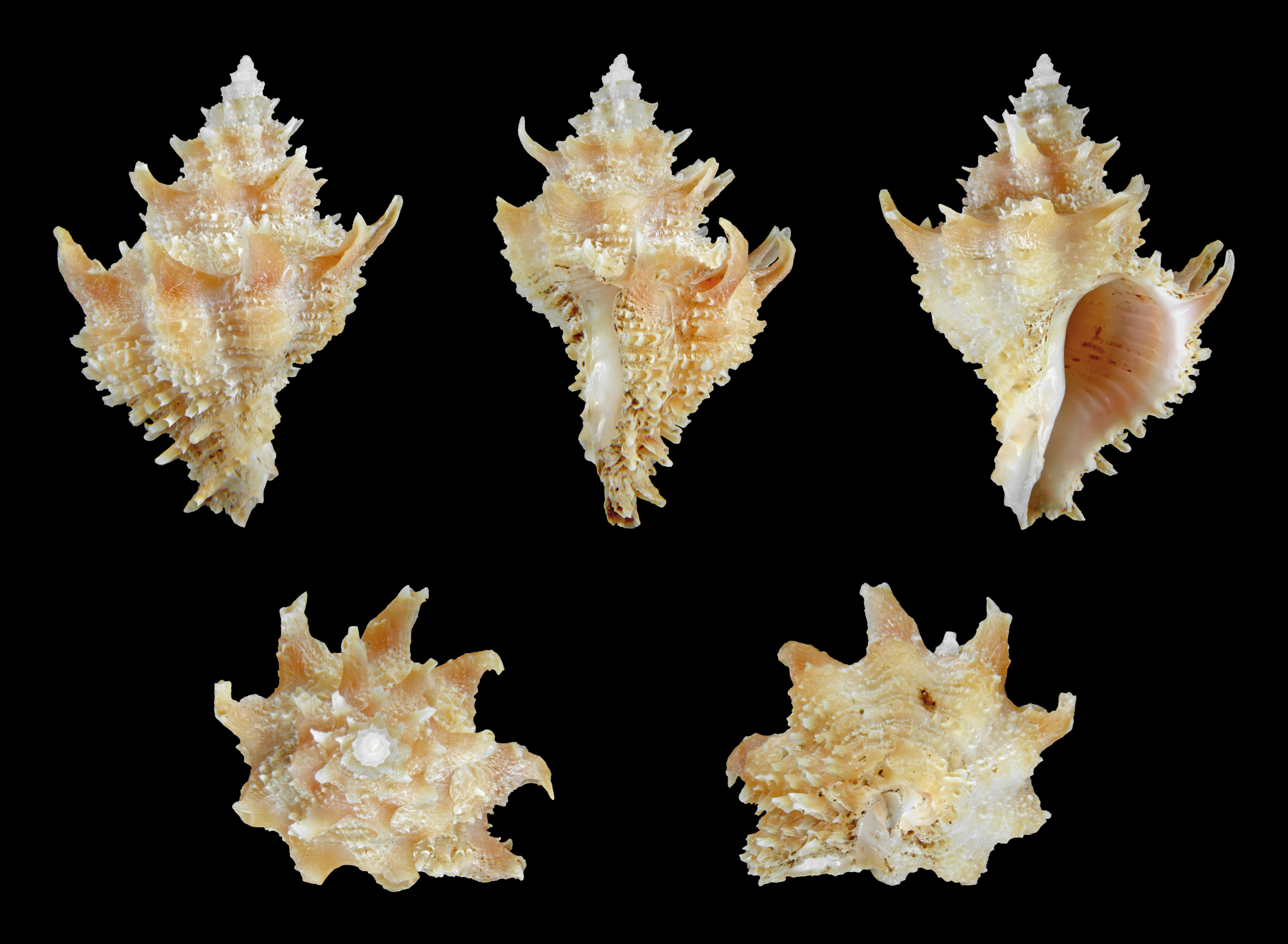
- Five views of a shell of Babalomurex nagahorii

Scientific classification
- Kingdom: Animalia
- Phylum: Mollusca
- Class: Gastropoda
- Subclass: Caenogastropoda
- Order: Neogastropoda
- Family: Muricidae
- Genus: Babelomurex
- Species: B. nagahorii

Binomial name
- Babelomurex nagahorii Kosuge, 1980

Synonyms
- Latiaxis (Babelomurex) nagahorii Kosuge, 1980 alternative representation; Latiaxis nagahorii Kosuge, 1980 (original combination)

= Babelomurex nagahorii =

Species of gastropod

Babelomurex nagahorii is a species of sea snail, a marine gastropod mollusc in the family Muricidae, the murex snails or rock snails.

== Description ==
The length of the shell attains 20 mm.

== Distribution ==
It is found on Balicasag Island in the Philippines.
