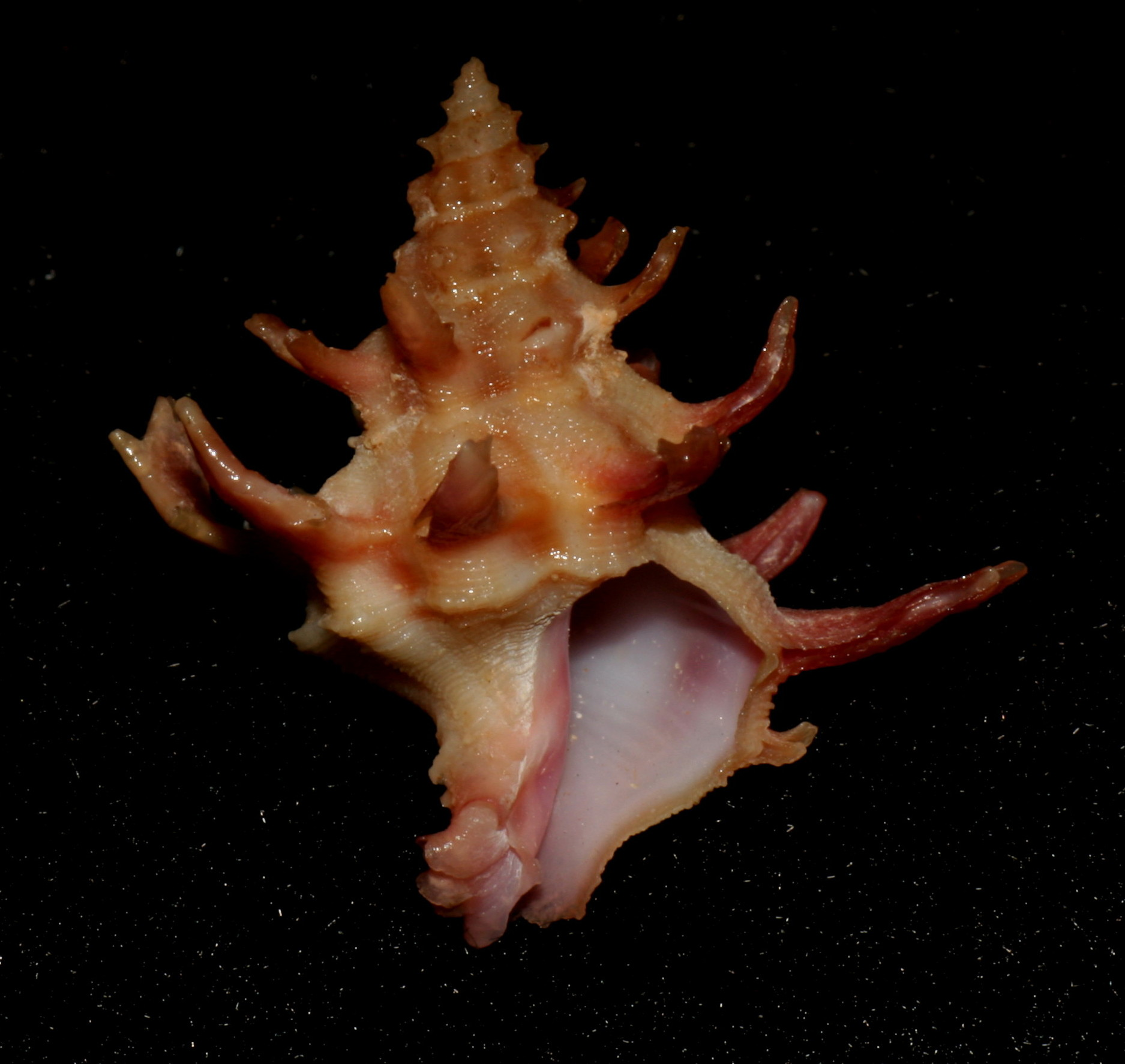
- A shell of Babelomurex gemmatus (Shikama, 1966), 33.6 mm in length, taken at 180 to 200 m in tangle nets off Panglao, Bohol Island, in the Philippines.

Scientific classification
- Kingdom: Animalia
- Phylum: Mollusca
- Class: Gastropoda
- Subclass: Caenogastropoda
- Order: Neogastropoda
- Family: Muricidae
- Genus: Babelomurex
- Species: B. gemmatus

Binomial name
- Babelomurex gemmatus (Shikama, 1966)

Synonyms
- Babelomurex fruticosus gemmatus (Shikama, 1966); Latiaxis (Babelomurex) gemmatus Shikama, 1966; Latiaxis gemmatus Shikama, 1966 (basionym)

= Babelomurex gemmatus =

Species of gastropod

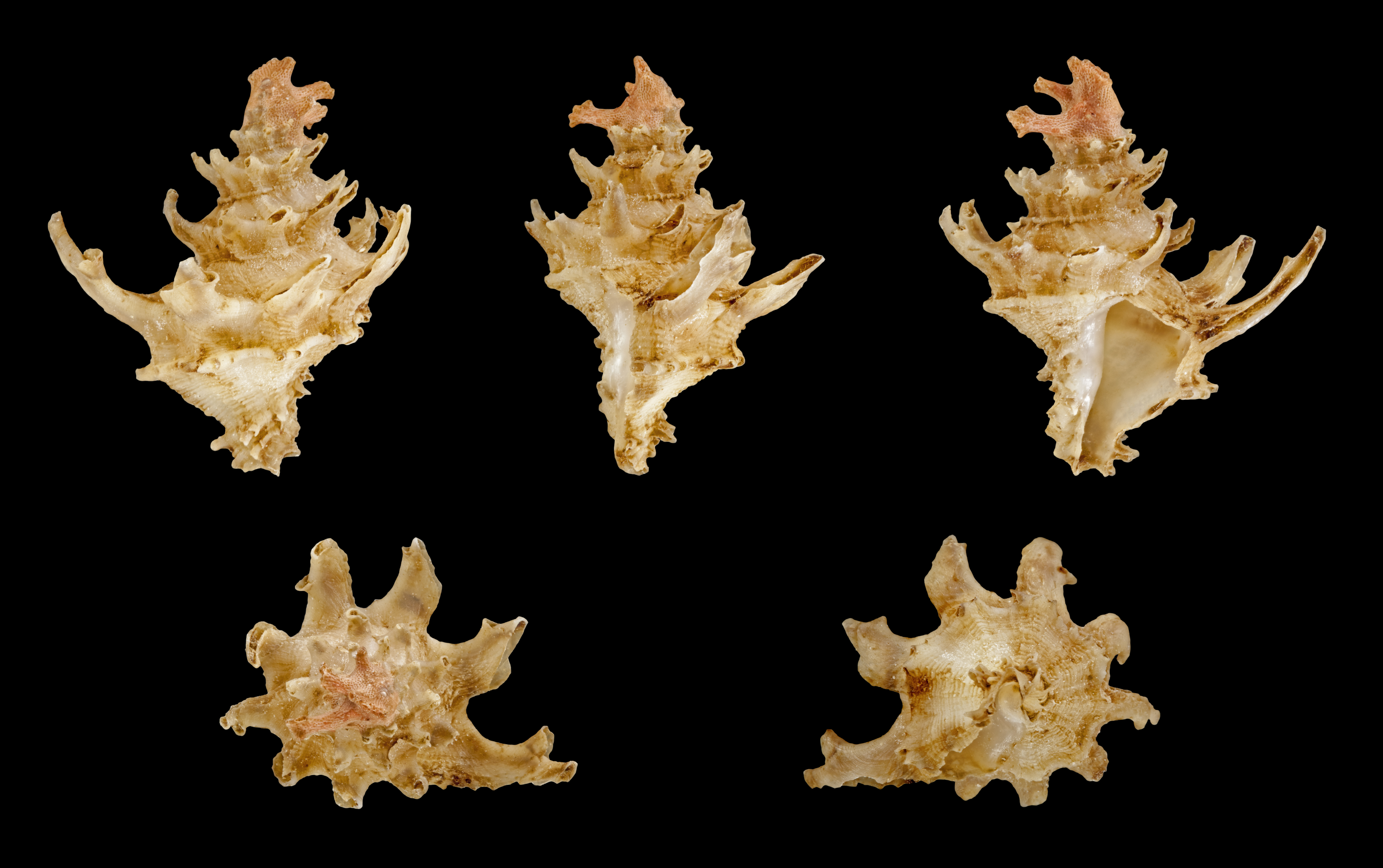
Babelomurex gemmatus shells

Babelomurex gemmatus is a species of sea snail, a marine gastropod mollusc in the family Muricidae, the murex snails or rock snails.

== Distyribution ==
This marine species occurs off Japan and the Philippines.
