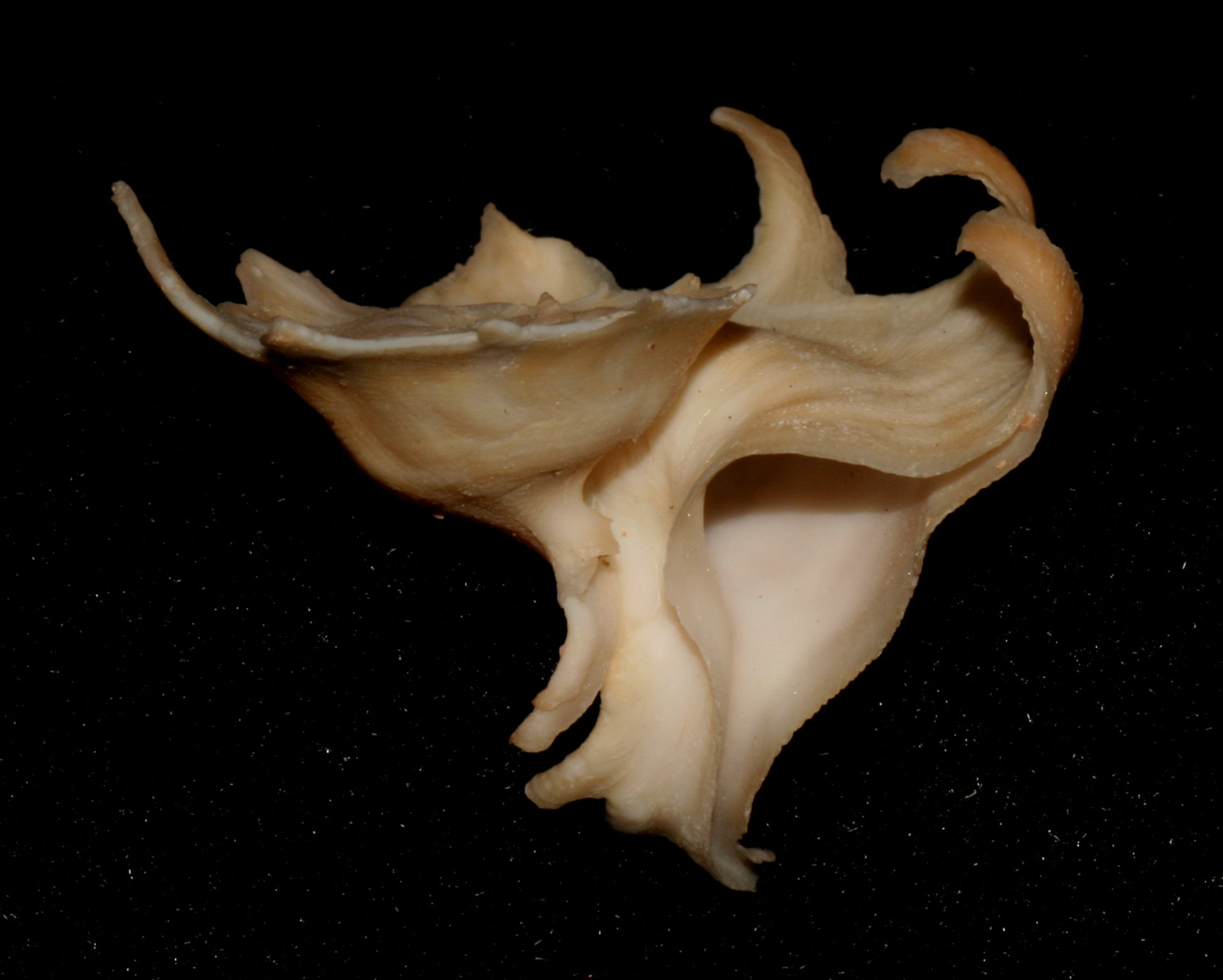
- Shell of Latiaxis mawae (Gray in Griffith & Pidgeon, 1834), measuring 25.4 mm in length, taken at 80 fathoms in tangle nets off Balicasag Island in the Philippines.

Scientific classification
- Kingdom: Animalia
- Phylum: Mollusca
- Class: Gastropoda
- Subclass: Caenogastropoda
- Order: Neogastropoda
- Family: Muricidae
- Genus: Latiaxis
- Species: L. mawae

Binomial name
- Latiaxis mawae (Gray, 1833)

Synonyms
- Latiaxis kylix Barnard, 1959; Latiaxis mawae kylix Barnard, 1959; Pyrula mawae Gray [in Griffith & Pidgeon], 1834

= Latiaxis mawae =

Species of gastropod

Latiaxis mawae is a species of sea snail, a marine gastropod mollusk in the family Muricidae, the murex snails or rock snails.
