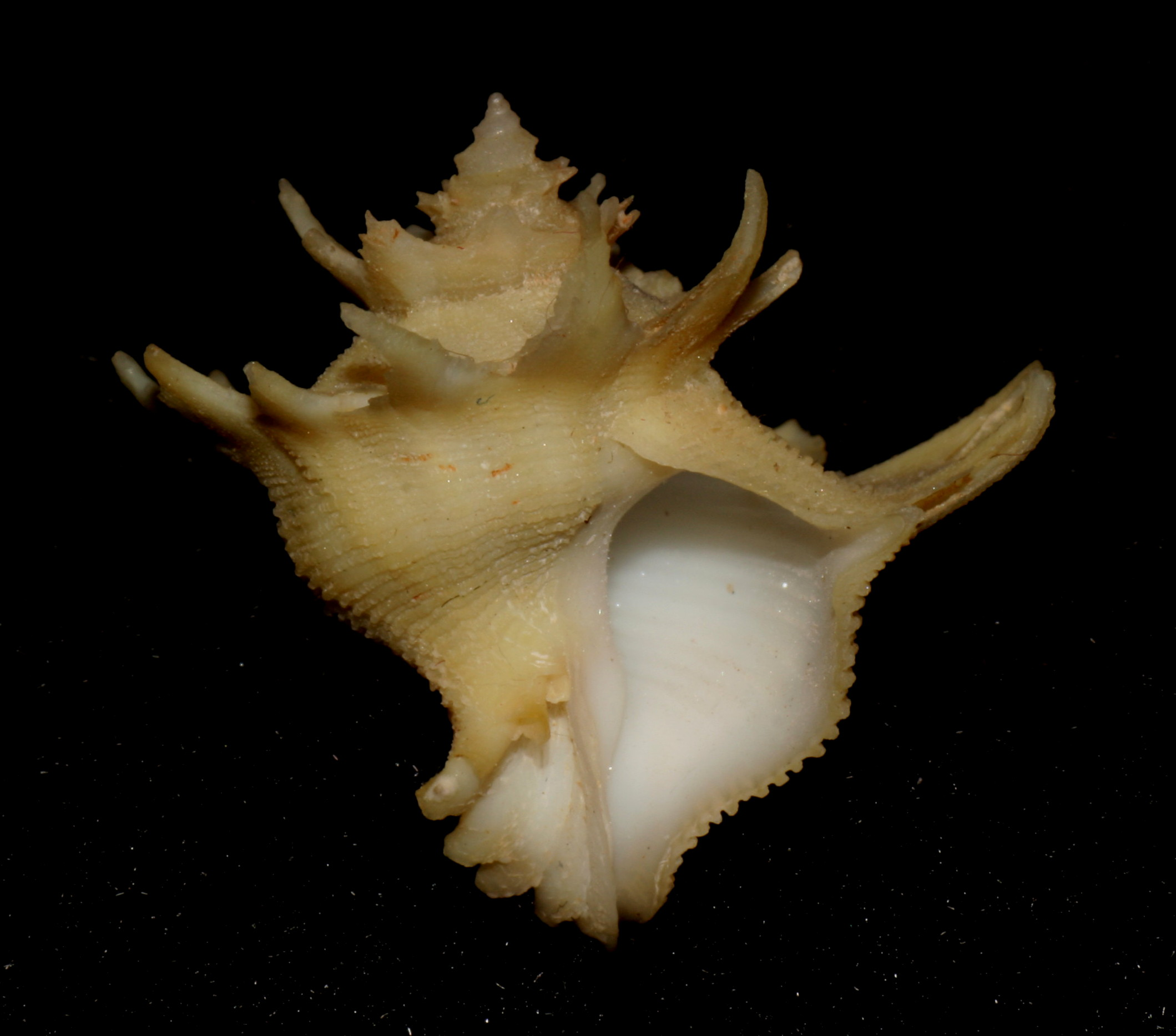
- A shell of Babelomurex deburghiae (Reeve, 1857), 22.6 mm in length, taken in tangle nets at 150 to 200 m, off Panglao Island, Bohol, in the Philippines

Scientific classification
- Kingdom: Animalia
- Phylum: Mollusca
- Class: Gastropoda
- Subclass: Caenogastropoda
- Order: Neogastropoda
- Family: Muricidae
- Genus: Babelomurex
- Species: B. deburghiae

Binomial name
- Babelomurex deburghiae (Reeve, 1857)

Synonyms
- Pyrula (Rhizochilus) deburghiae Reeve, 1857 (original combination)

= Babelomurex deburghiae =

Species of gastropod

Babelomurex deburghiae is a species of sea snail, a marine gastropod mollusc in the family Muricidae, the murex snails or rock snails.

== Description ==
(Original description in Latin) The shell is pear-shaped to ovate and features a somewhat narrow umbilicus. The spire is relatively short and turreted. The whorls are broadly and angularly expanded at their upper part, and they are crowned at the angle with moderately large, flatly compressed scales arranged like a fan. Below this, toward the base, the whorls attenuate and are densely covered everywhere with ridges, which are very finely serrated. The shell is white, and the throat of the aperture is grooved.

== Distribution ==
This marine species has a wide distribution and occurs off Japan, the Philippines; in the Indian Ocean South Africa; in the Caribbean Sea off Florida, USA.
