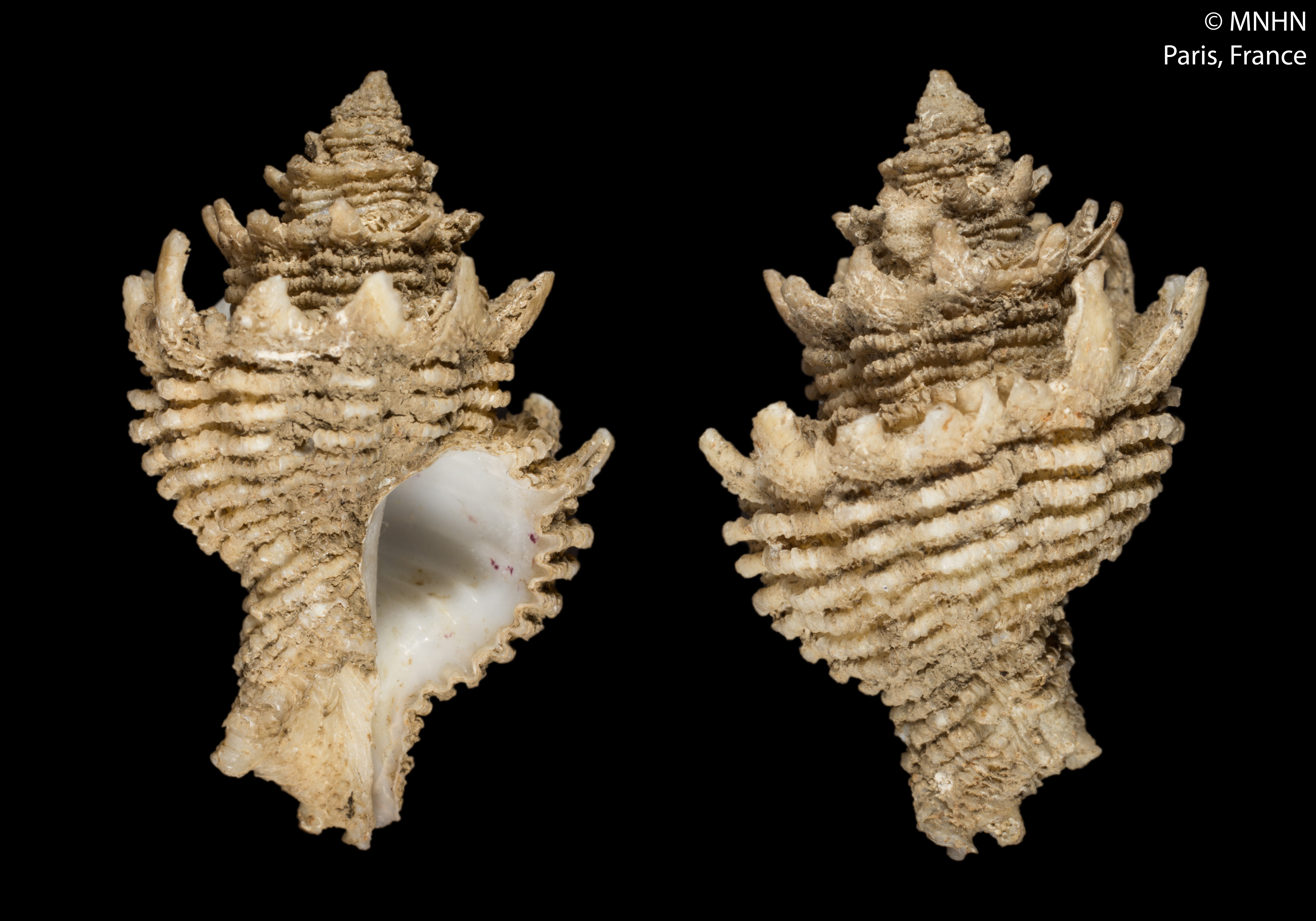
- Shell of Babelomurex benoiti (syntype at MNHN, Paris)

Scientific classification
- Kingdom: Animalia
- Phylum: Mollusca
- Class: Gastropoda
- Subclass: Caenogastropoda
- Order: Neogastropoda
- Family: Muricidae
- Genus: Babelomurex
- Species: B. benoiti

Binomial name
- Babelomurex benoiti (Tiberi, 1855)

Synonyms
- Latiaxis amaliae (Kobelt, 1907); Latiaxis benoiti (Tiberi, 1855); Murex benoiti Tiberi, 1855; Pseudomurex amaliae Kobelt, 1907

= Babelomurex benoiti =

Species of gastropod

Babelomurex benoiti is a species of sea snail, a marine gastropod mollusc in the family Muricidae, the murex snails or rock snails.

== Description ==
Its shell is white-yellowish with many small ridges. The shell is normally 20mm – 45mm in length, the mean being around 38mm.

(Original description in Latin) The shell is ovate-turreted and sharp, featuring highly convex whorls. These whorls are longitudinally plicated (folded), distinctly carinated (keeled), and encircled transversely by overlapping, imbricated scales. Around the keel, a series of triangular, recurved, and oblong laminae are spirally arranged. The outer lip is sulcate (grooved), the tail is extended, and the siphonal canal is wide open.

== Distribution ==
The species occurs in the Eastern Mediterranean Sea, off the coasts of Sardinia, Greece and Turkey.
