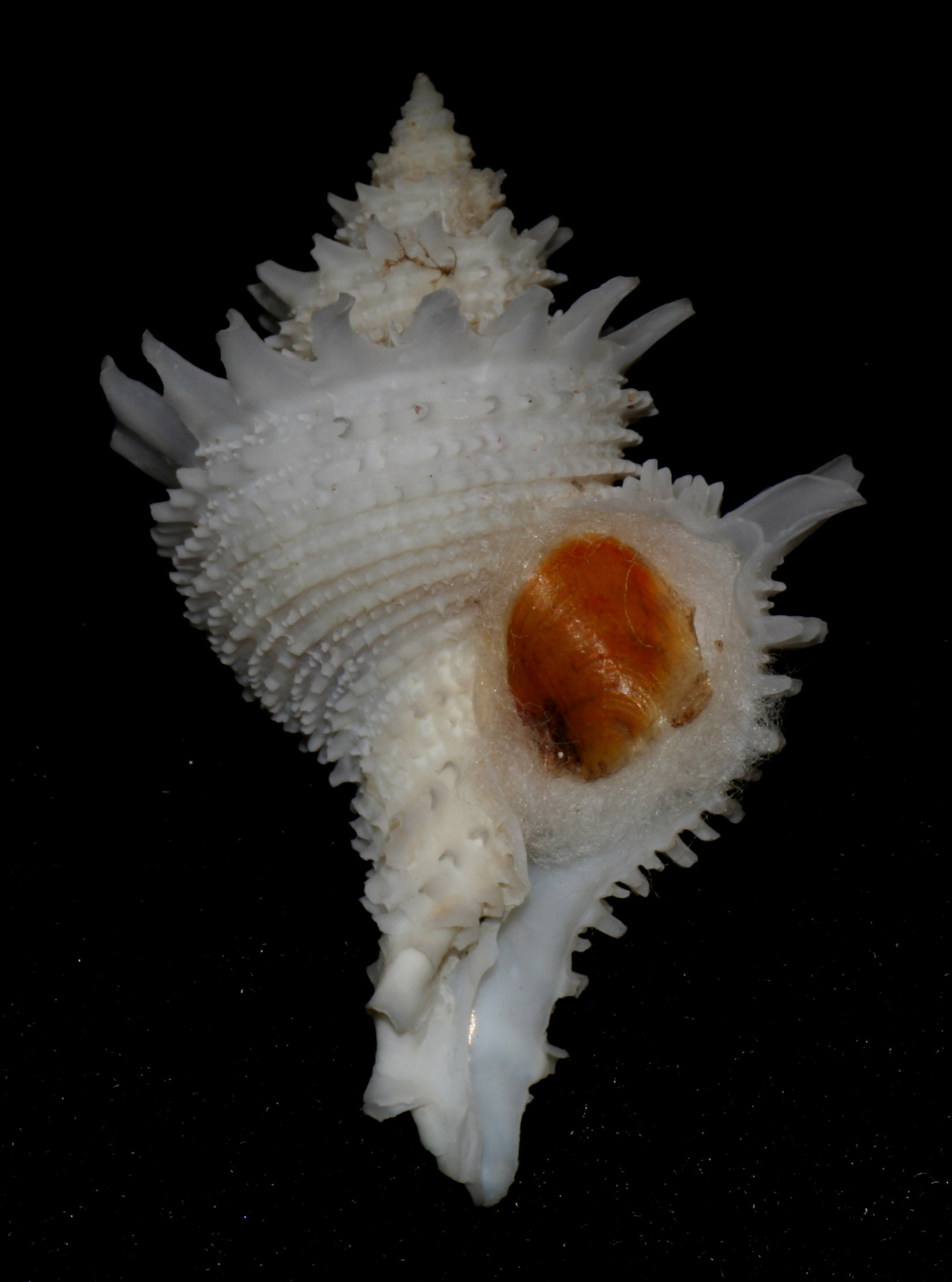
- A shell of Babelomurex lischkeanus (Dunker, 1882) and operculum, measuring 38.5 mm in length, trawled at 40 fathoms off Tosa Bay, Shikoku, in Japan

Scientific classification
- Kingdom: Animalia
- Phylum: Mollusca
- Class: Gastropoda
- Subclass: Caenogastropoda
- Order: Neogastropoda
- Family: Muricidae
- Genus: Babelomurex
- Species: B. lischkeanus

Binomial name
- Babelomurex lischkeanus (Dunker, 1882)

Synonyms
- Latiaxis (Toreuma) lischkeanus (Dunker, 1882) (superseded combination); Latiaxis lischkeanus (Dunker, 1882); Rapana lischkeana Dunker, 1882 (basionym); Tolema australis Laseron, 1955; Tolema peregrina Powell, 1947

= Babelomurex lischkeanus =

Species of gastropod

Babelomurex lischkeanus, otherwise known as the Australian coral shell is a species of sea snail, a marine gastropod mollusc in the family Muricidae, the murex snails or rock snails.

== Description ==
The sea snail is most commonly seen with a pure white shell, that is somewhat jagged. The shell is approximately 50 mm (2 in) in length at adult size.

(Original description in Latin) The shell is more or less fusiform, milk-white, and translucent. It consists of seven or eight stepped whorls that are separated by a deeply cut suture, and it is equipped with large, compressed, erect, and sharp scales, as well as densely overlapping transverse ridges. The columella is slightly sinuous, the aperture is ovate, and the rostrum is relatively long and nearly straight. The siphonal canal is open, and the umbilicus is bordered on the outside by larger scales. The outer lip is scarcely grooved on the inside, being completely smooth in younger specimens.

This highly elegant species is variable in its general form, and it is particularly remarkable for the formation of its scales. The scales on the upper part of the whorls are large, erect, compressed, and smooth, and these spine-like structures render the spire distinctly stepped. Furthermore, the entire shell is surrounded by transverse ridges, which are covered with dense, erect, tiny scales. The operculum is brown and horny, and it corresponds to the opercula typical of the genus Purpura.

== Distribution ==
The seas snail is found along the Eastern coast of Australia, from Tasmania to the Southern parts of Queensland.
