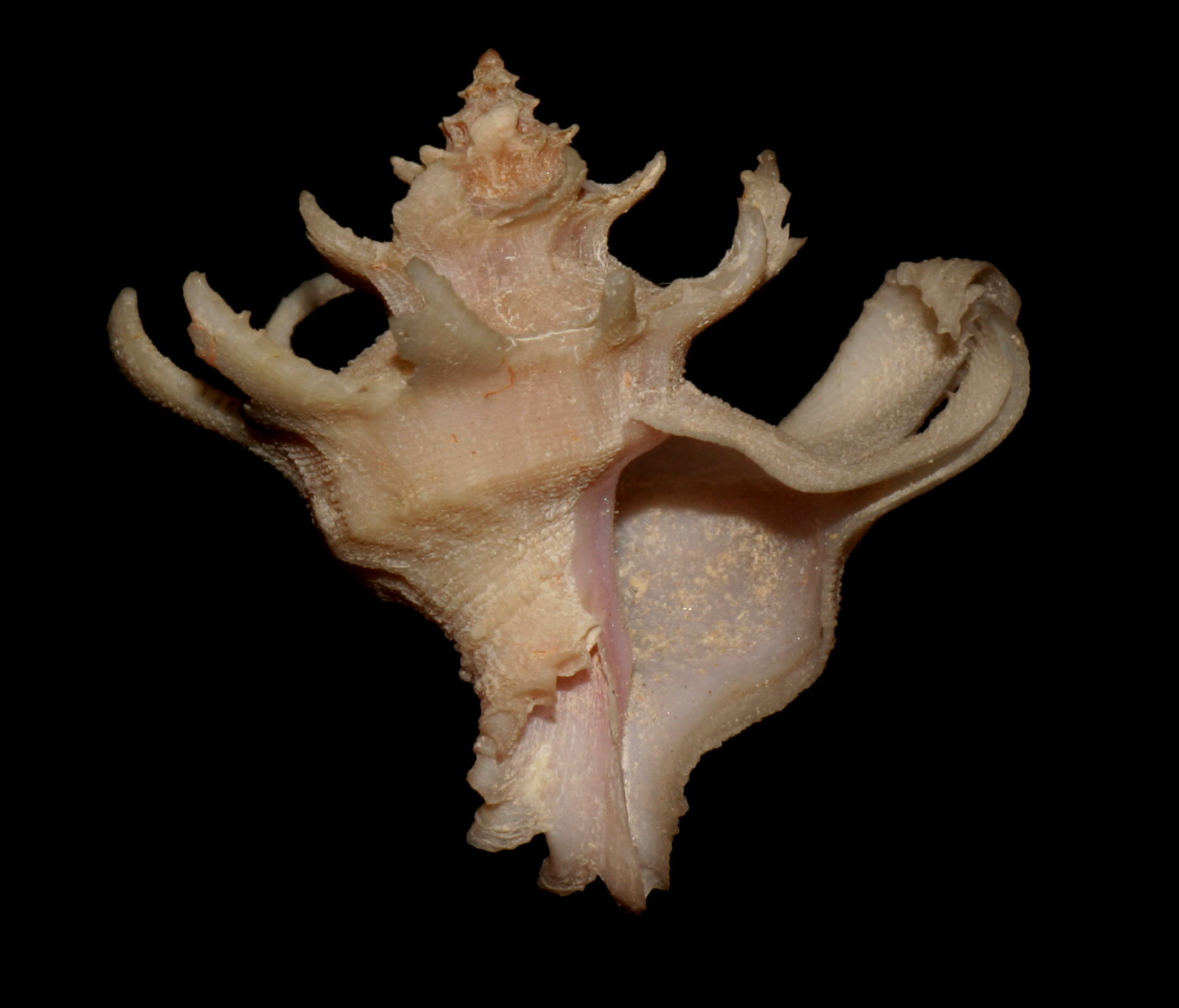
- A shell of Babelomurex nakayasui (Shikama, 1970), measuring 22.5 mm in length, trawled at 80 fathoms off Bohol Island in the Philippines

Scientific classification
- Kingdom: Animalia
- Phylum: Mollusca
- Class: Gastropoda
- Subclass: Caenogastropoda
- Order: Neogastropoda
- Family: Muricidae
- Genus: Babelomurex
- Species: B. nakayasui

Binomial name
- Babelomurex nakayasui (Shikama, 1970)

Synonyms
- Latiaxis (Babelomurex) nakayasui Shikama, 1970 (original combination)

= Babelomurex nakayasui =

Species of gastropod

Babelomurex nakayasui is a species of sea snail, a marine gastropod mollusc in the family Muricidae, the murex snails or rock snails.

== Description ==
The length of the shell attains 31.6 mm, its diameter 21.3 mm.

== Distribution ==
This marine species occurs off Japan, Taiwan, the Philippines, New Caledonia and the Loyalty Islands.
