= Angaria nhatrangensis =

Scientific classification
- Kingdom: Animalia
- Phylum: Mollusca
- Class: Gastropoda
- Subclass: Vetigastropoda
- Order: Trochida
- Family: Angariidae
- Genus: Angaria
- Species: A. nhatrangensis

Binomial name
- Angaria nhatrangensis Dekker, 2006

Species of gastropod

Angaria nhatrangensis is a species of sea snail, a marine gastropod mollusk in the family Angariidae.

== Description ==
The shell can grow to be 35 mm to 65 mm in length. It has a depressed apex, pentagonal whorls with peripheral rows of spines, and numerous spiral ribs. The shell is dirty white to light greenish with bright pinkish-red spiral cords and purplish-red colouration inside the umbilicus. The aperture is round and nacreous inside.

The species is distinguished from the similar Angaria neglecta by its coarser spines and pink-red spiral colouration, and from Angaria delphinus by its colour pattern and larger spines.

== Distribution ==
Angaria nhatrangensis can be found off of Vietnam. According to Deller, they inhabit rocky substrates at 5-10 metres depth and are known only from the Nha Trang region of central Vietnam.
