= Theodor Löbbecke =

German pharmacist and malacologist (1821 - 1901)

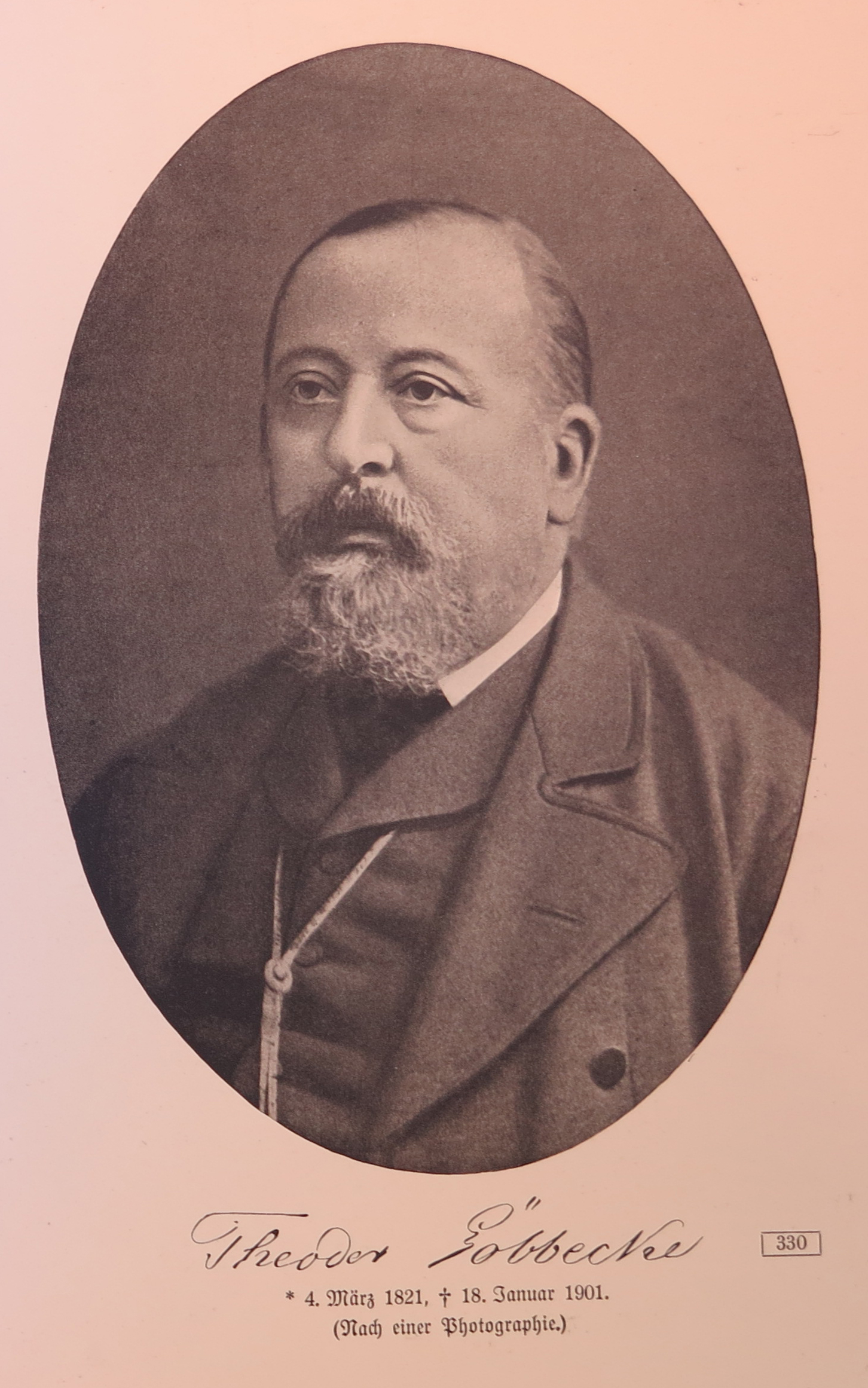
Theodor Löbbecke (1821–1901)

Carl Heinrich Wilhelm Theodor Löbbecke (March 4, 1821, Hückeswagen — January 18, 1901, Düsseldorf) was a German pharmacist, malacologist and the founder of the collections of the Aquazoo Löbbecke Museum in Düsseldorf. His collection is still preserved by the institution and rich in type material of several mollusc species, such as the Chicoreus loebbeckei but also contains many template individuals depicted in early malacological literature.

== Life ==
Löbbecke left the school in Elberfeld in 1837 and spent the next six years training as a pharmacist. In 1843 he studied for a year at the University of Berlin, after which he was licensed to become a first-class pharmacist. Around 1846, Löbbecke took over the Einhorn pharmacy in Duisburg, at which time he also began to build up his collection. The physician, natural scientist and natural history collector Wilhelm Ludwig Döring was his uncle and possible influence on his own ambitions to collect sea shells. By traveling through Europe, the Near East and Africa, as well as by buying up other researchers' collections, he was able to steadily increase his collection, which is why he was soon after not only jokingly referred to as the "Mussel King", because around 1880 he had the largest conchyliacollection in Europe. After giving up his pharmacy in 1873, he set up a private museum at Schadowstraße 51 in Düsseldorf. During the following years he also worked on the second edition of the "Systematische Conchylia-Cabinet", a work on identification of snails and mussels. In 1883 he married Caroline Biesterfeld, with whom he retired from 1886 and gave up his scientific activities completely. Löbbecke died in 1901 at his home in Düsseldorf. Theodor Löbbecke is buried in the Nordfriedhof in Düsseldorf. Posthumously a street was named after him in his native town of Hückeswagen. Moreover, several mollusc species bear his name, such as the Chicoreus loebbeckei and the Angaria loebbeckei.
