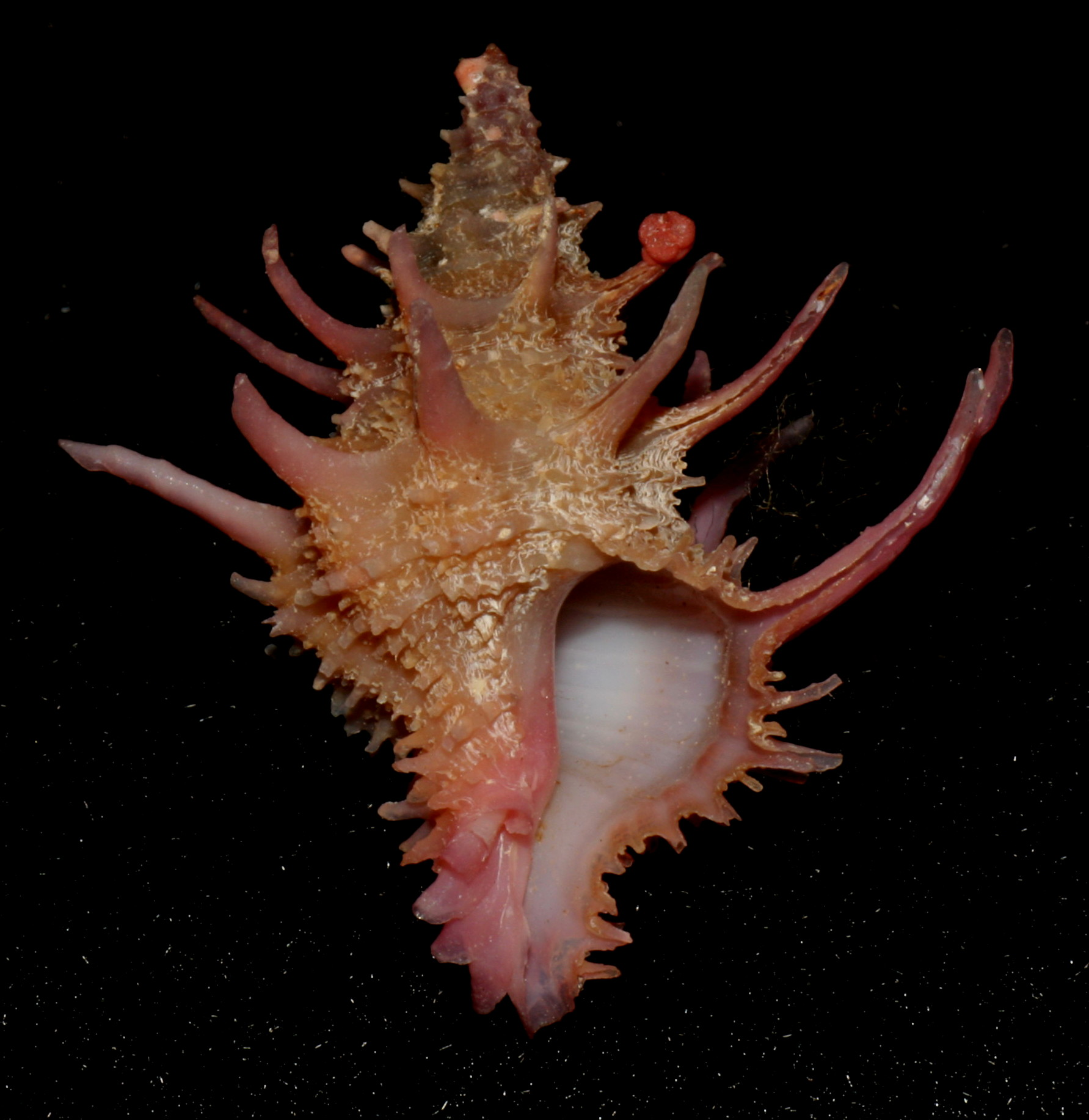
- Shell of Babelomurex takahashii (Kosuge, 1979), measuring 23.7 mm in length, taken by tangle nets at 80 fathoms off Balicasag Island, Bohol, in the Philippines

Scientific classification
- Kingdom: Animalia
- Phylum: Mollusca
- Class: Gastropoda
- Subclass: Caenogastropoda
- Order: Neogastropoda
- Family: Muricidae
- Genus: Babelomurex
- Species: B. takahashii

Binomial name
- Babelomurex takahashii (Kosuge, 1979)

Synonyms
- Latiaxis (Echinolatiaxis) takahashii Kosuge, 1979 (basionym); Latiaxis takahashii Kosuge, 1979 (original combination)

= Babelomurex takahashii =

Species of gastropod

Babelomurex takahashii is a species of sea snail, a marine gastropod mollusc in the family Muricidae, the murex snails or rock snails.

== Distribution ==
This marine species occurs off Japan, the Philippines and French Polynesia.
