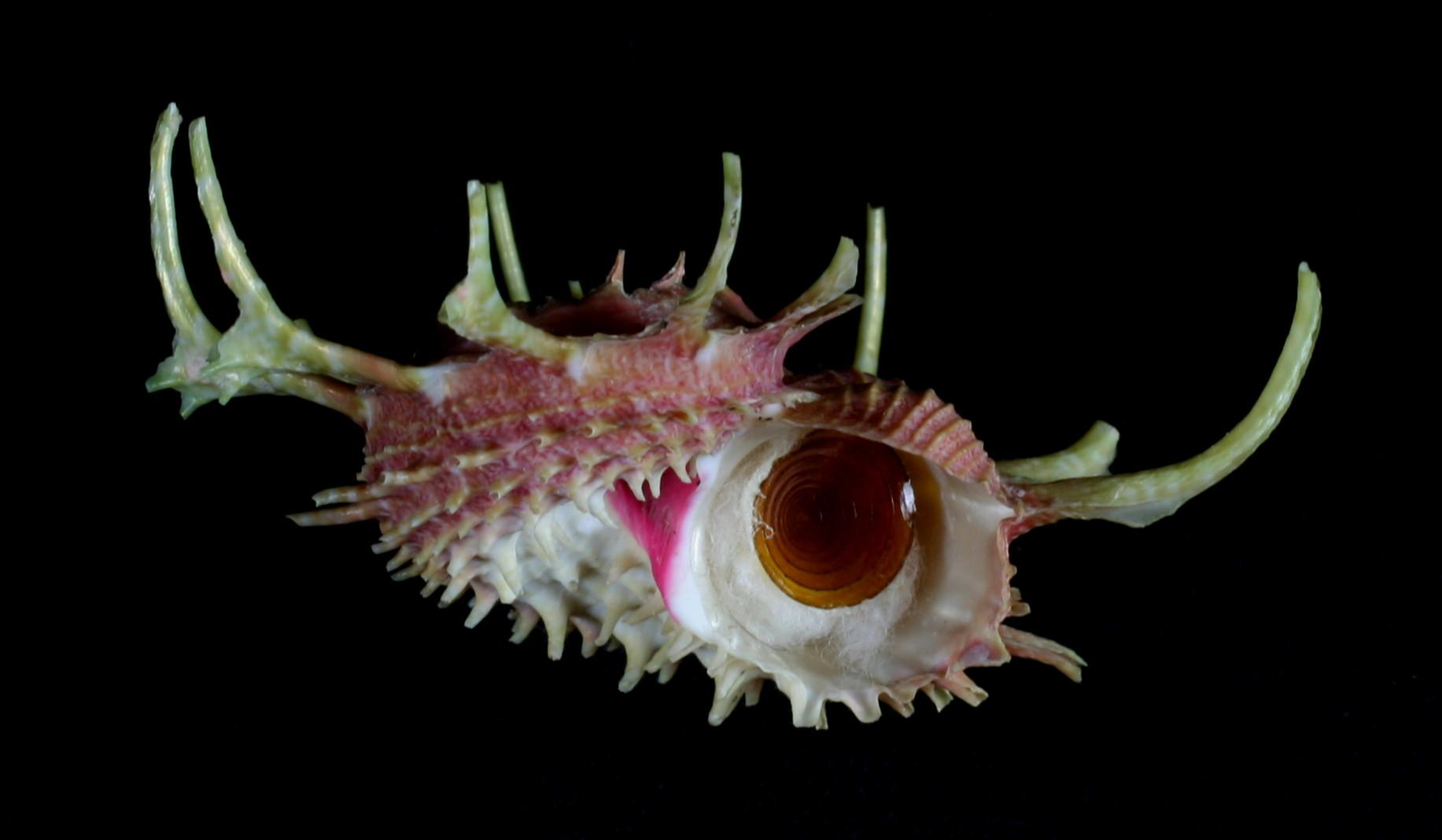
- Shell of Angaria sphaerula (Kiener, 1838) with operculum measuring 24.1 mm in height by 34.4 mm diameter, taken by tangle nets off Balut Cotabato, in the Philippines.

Scientific classification
- Kingdom: Animalia
- Phylum: Mollusca
- Class: Gastropoda
- Subclass: Vetigastropoda
- Order: Trochida
- Family: Angariidae
- Genus: Angaria
- Species: A. sphaerula

Binomial name
- Angaria sphaerula (Kiener, 1838)

Synonyms
- Delphinula sphaerula Kiener, 1838

= Angaria sphaerula =

Species of gastropod

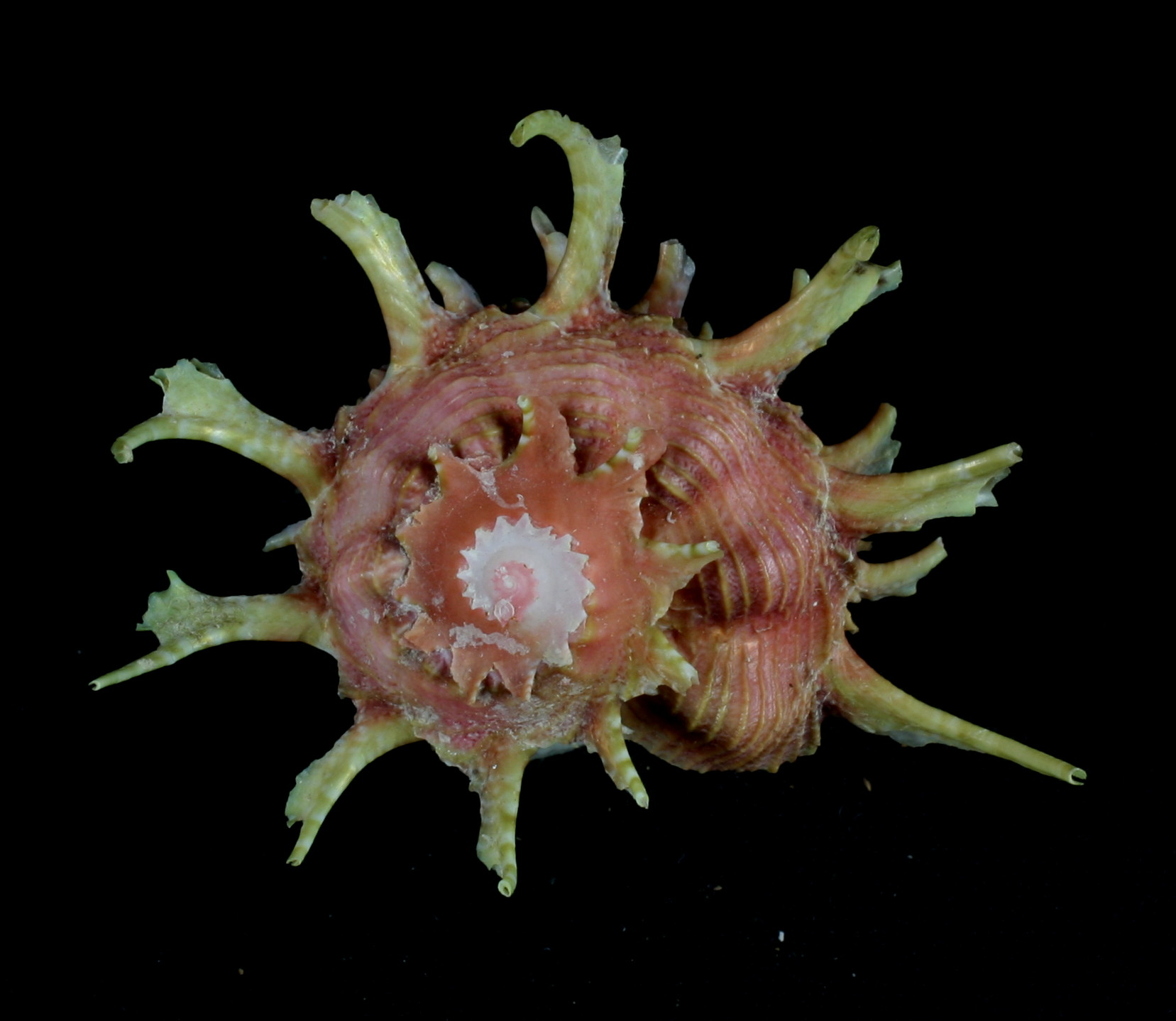
Apical view of the Shell of Angaria sphaerula (Kiener, 1838) with operculum measuring 24.1 mm in height by 34.4 mm diameter, taken by tangle nets off Balut Cotabato, in the Philippines.

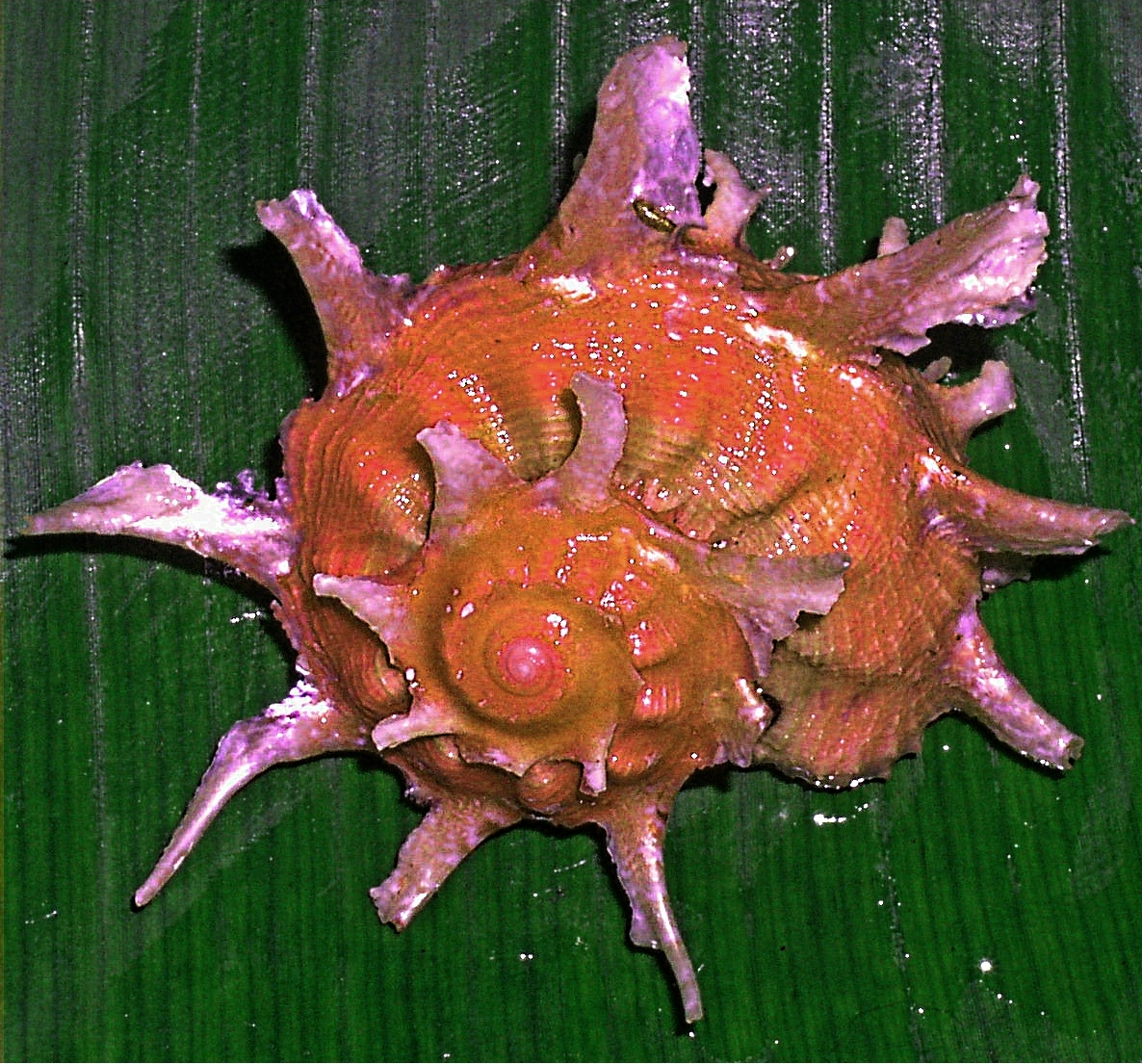
Apical view of another specimen of Angaria sphaerula showing color variation within the species.

Angaria sphaerula, common name Kiener's delphinula, is a species of sea snail, a marine gastropod mollusc of the family Angariidae.

== Description ==
The shell ranges in length from 30 to 100 mm.

Like other species of Angaria, A. sphaerula is highly ornamented, with the shape of its ornaments varying from spikes to fronds. The ornaments are often quite large. This species tends to be a mix of light green and pinkish-red in color. The interior of the shell is pearlescent.

== Distribution ==
This species can be found in the Philippines and parts of the western Pacific Ocean.
