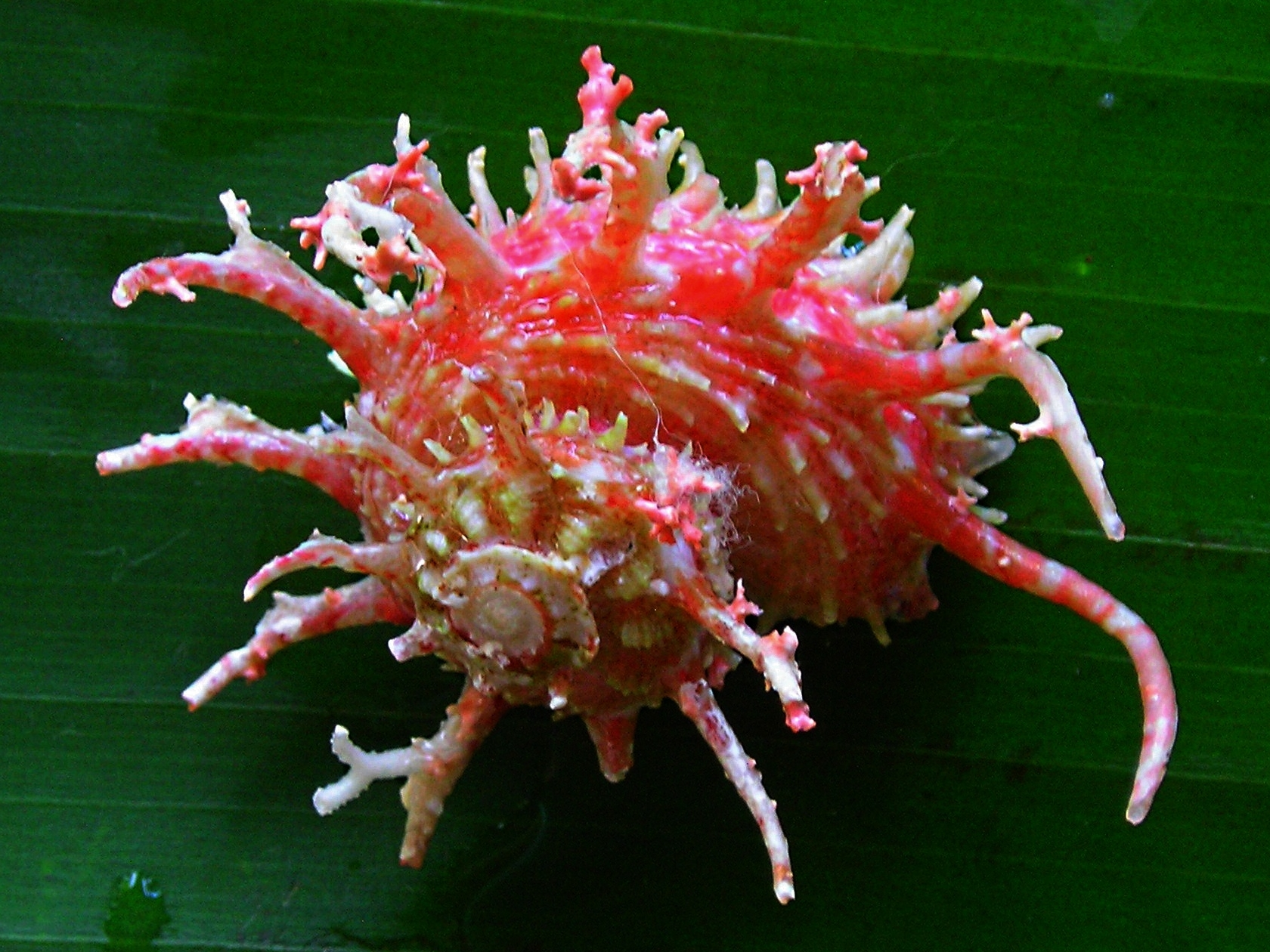

Scientific classification
- Kingdom: Animalia
- Phylum: Mollusca
- Class: Gastropoda
- Subclass: Vetigastropoda
- Order: Trochida
- Family: Angariidae
- Genus: Angaria
- Species: A. vicdani

Binomial name
- Angaria vicdani Kosuge, 1980

= Angaria vicdani =

Species of gastropod

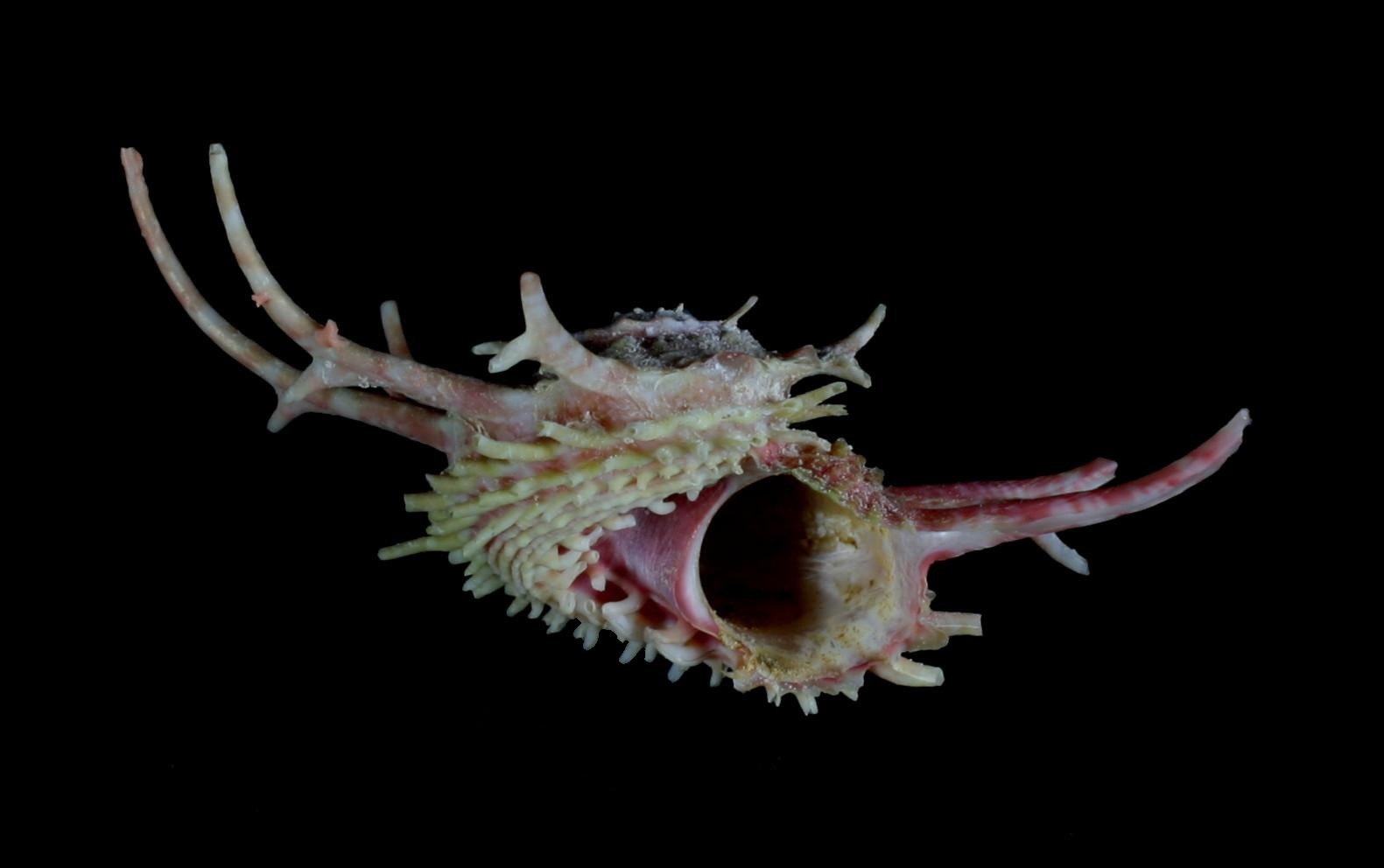
Shell of Angaria vicdani Kosuge, 1980, measuring 19.6 mm (0.77 in) in height by 24.1 mm (0.95 in) diameter, taken by tangle nets off Samar Island, in the Philippines.

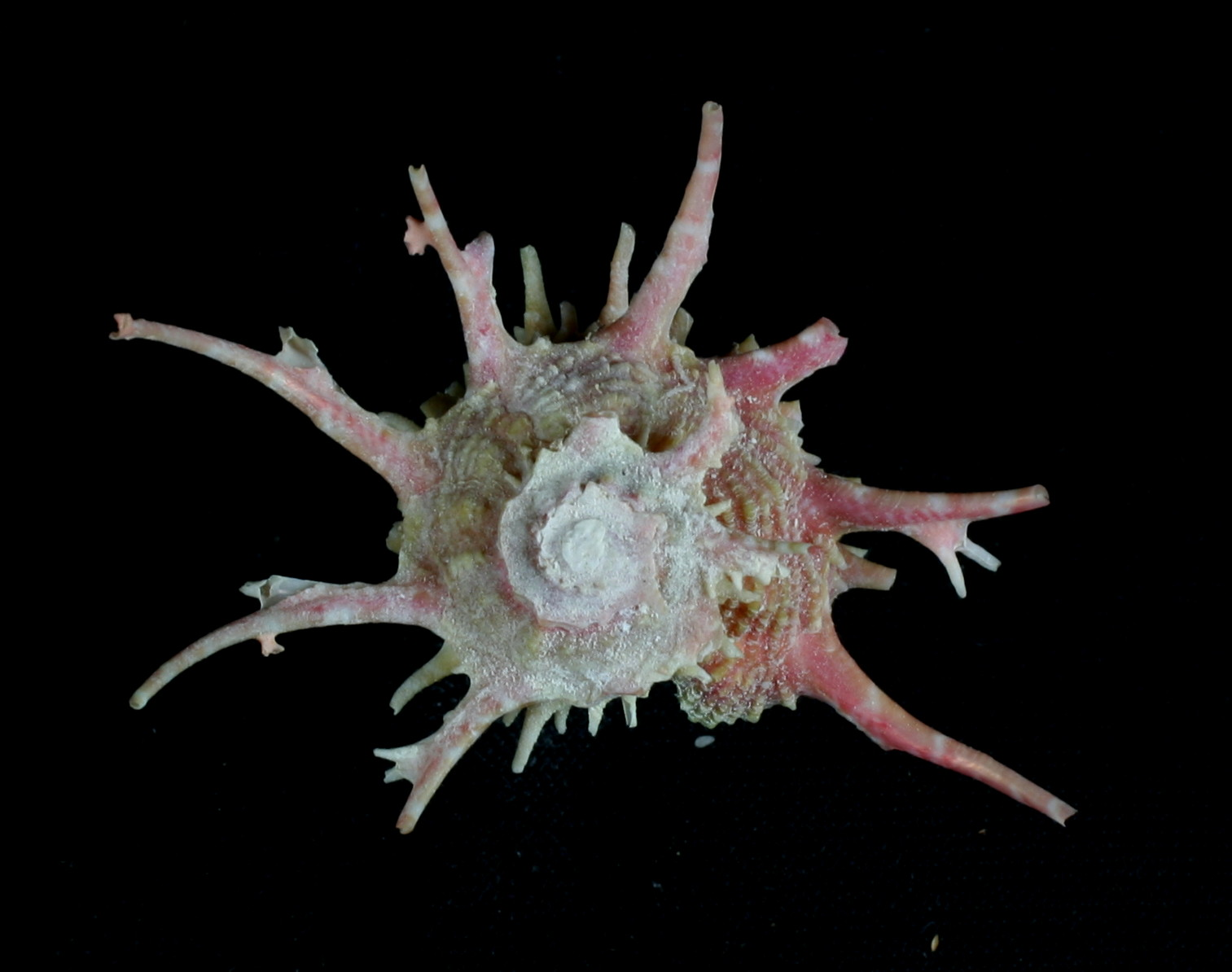
Apical view of shell of Angaria vicdani Kosuge, 1980, measuring 19.6 mm (0.77 in) in height by 24.1 mm (0.95 in) diameter, taken by tangle nets off Samar Island, in the Philippines.

Angaria vicdani is a species of sea snail, a marine gastropod mollusc of the family Angariidae.

== Description ==
The shell can grow up to 45 mm (1.8 in) to 85 mm (3.3 in) in length.

== Distribution ==
Angaria vicdani can be found off of the South Philippines.
