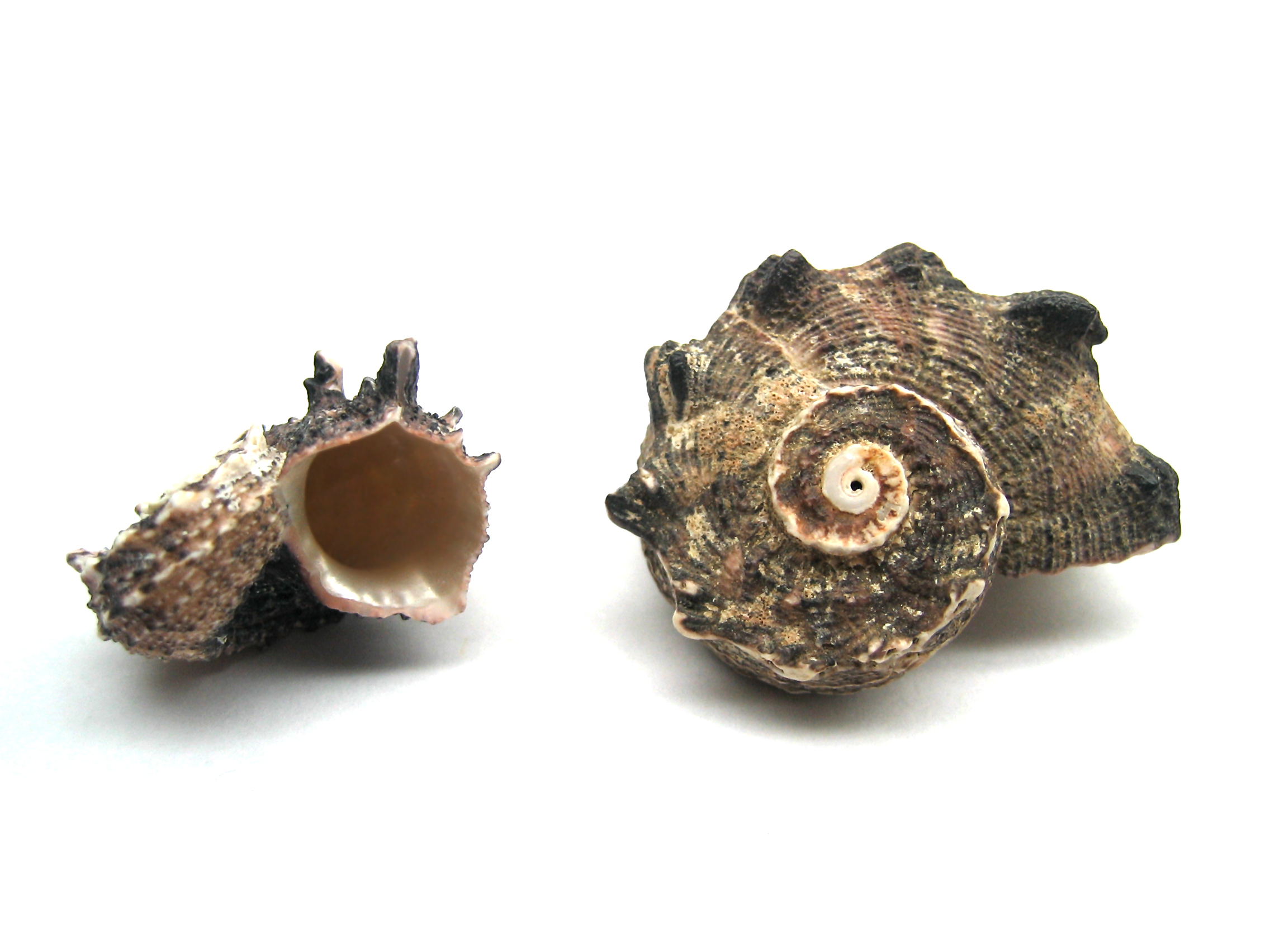
- Views of two shells of Angaria delphinus

Scientific classification
- Kingdom: Animalia
- Phylum: Mollusca
- Class: Gastropoda
- Subclass: Vetigastropoda
- Superfamily: Angarioidea; Gray, 1857

= Angarioidea =

Superfamily of gastropods

Angarioidea is a superfamily of small to medium sized sea snails, marine gastropod molluscs in the clade Vetigastropoda.

== Taxonomy ==
The superfamily Angarioidea was created as a new superfamily by Williams et al. (2008). The same suggest that something similar may be done in the future for Arene, but Bouchet & Rocroi (2005) note that Areneinae McLean, 2001, introduced in a congress abstract, is not an available family-level name.

This superfamily consists of the two following families:

- Angariidae Gray, 1857 - only one genus Angaria Röding, 1798
- Areneidae - Areneidae is however not officially described as a taxon name. Areneidae is provisionally placed within the superfamily Angarioidea according to Williams et al. (2008). It contains two genera: Arene Adams, 1845 and Cinysca Killburn, 1970.

Both are now placed in the superfamily Trochoidea.
