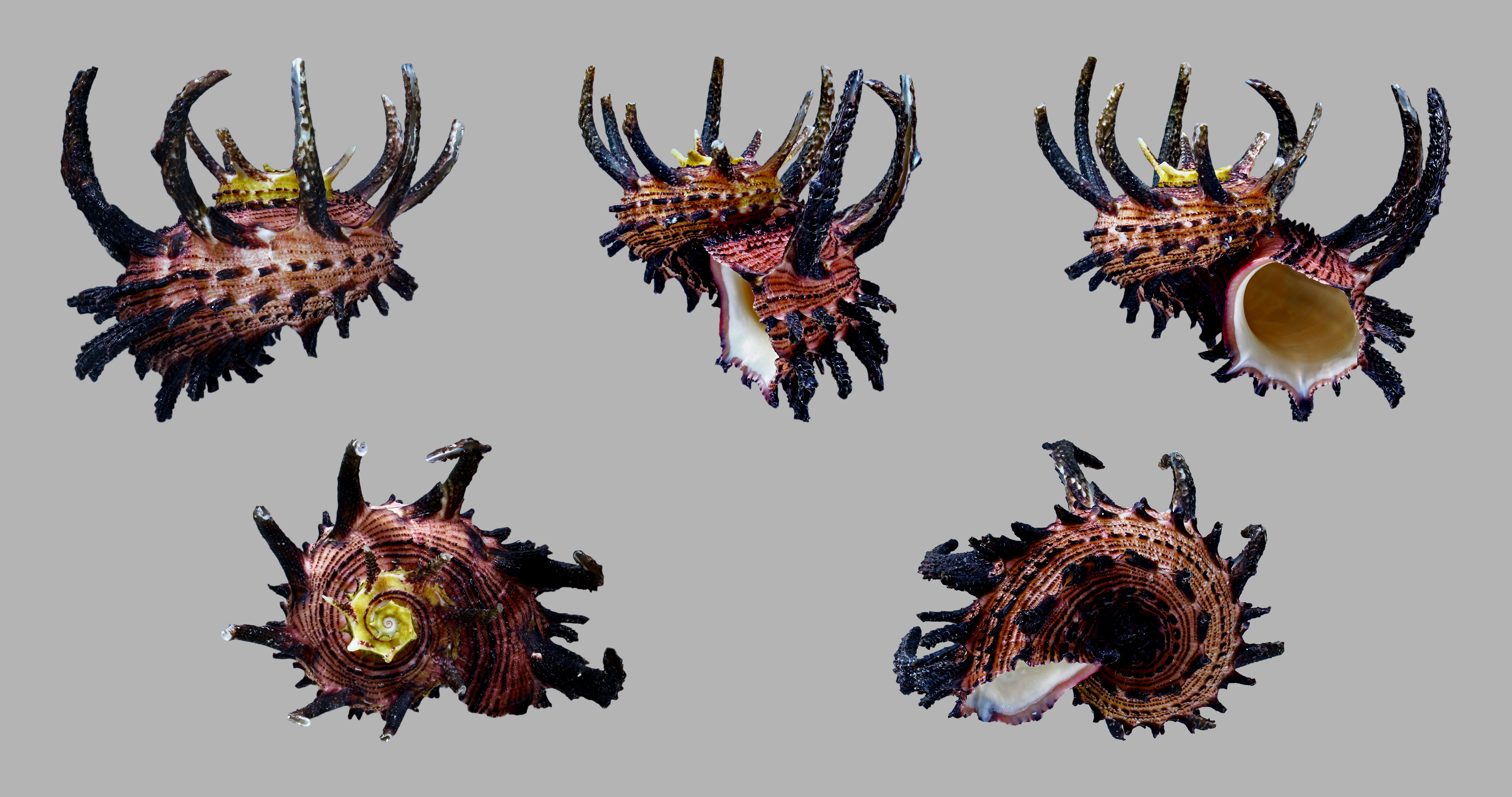
- Shell of Angaria melanacantha (Reeve, 1842)

Scientific classification
- Kingdom: Animalia
- Phylum: Mollusca
- Class: Gastropoda
- Subclass: Vetigastropoda
- Order: Trochida
- Family: Angariidae
- Genus: Angaria
- Species: A. melanacantha

Binomial name
- Angaria melanacantha (Reeve, 1842)

Synonyms
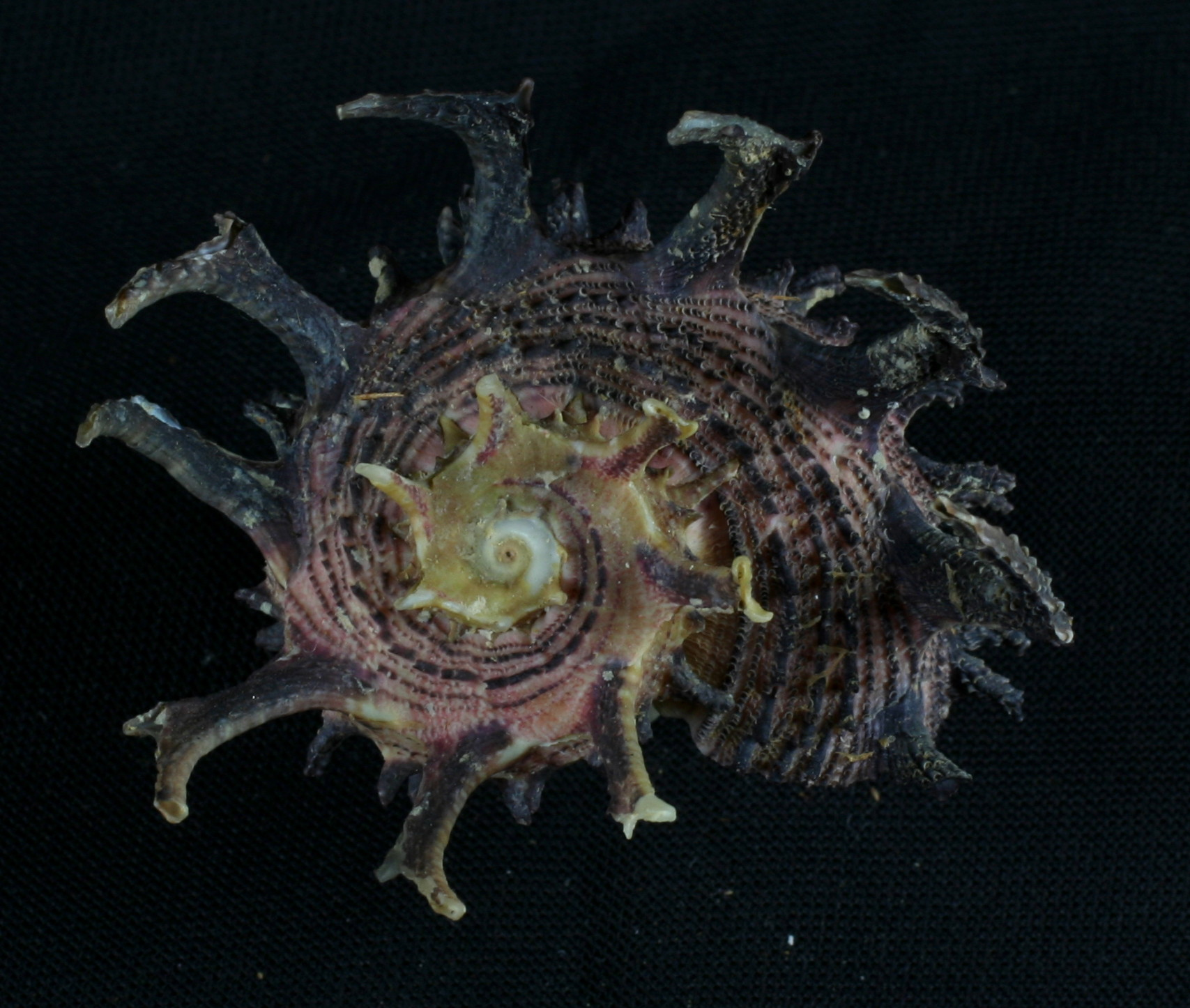
- Delphinula imperialis Reeve, 1843; Delphinula melanacantha Reeve, 1842 Apical view of shell of Angaria melanacantha (Reeve, 1842), measuring 31.2 mm height by 42.2 mm diameter, trawled off Palawan, in the Philippines.

= Angaria melanacantha =

Species of gastropod

Angaria melanacantha, common name the black-tankard angaria, is a species of sea snail, a marine gastropod mollusk in the family Angariidae.

== Description ==
The shell can grow to be 35 mm to 95 mm in length.

== Distribution ==
Angaria melanacantha can be found off the Philippines and Vietnam.

== External References ==
- Poppe G.T. & Goto Y. (1993) Recent Angariidae. Ancona: Informatore Piceno. 32 pls, 10 pls.
