= Angaria javanica =

Scientific classification
- Kingdom: Animalia
- Phylum: Mollusca
- Class: Gastropoda
- Subclass: Vetigastropoda
- Order: Trochida
- Superfamily: Trochoidea
- Family: Angariidae
- Genus: Angaria
- Species: A. javanica

Binomial name
- Angaria javanica K. Monsecour & D. Monsecour, 1999

Species of gastropod

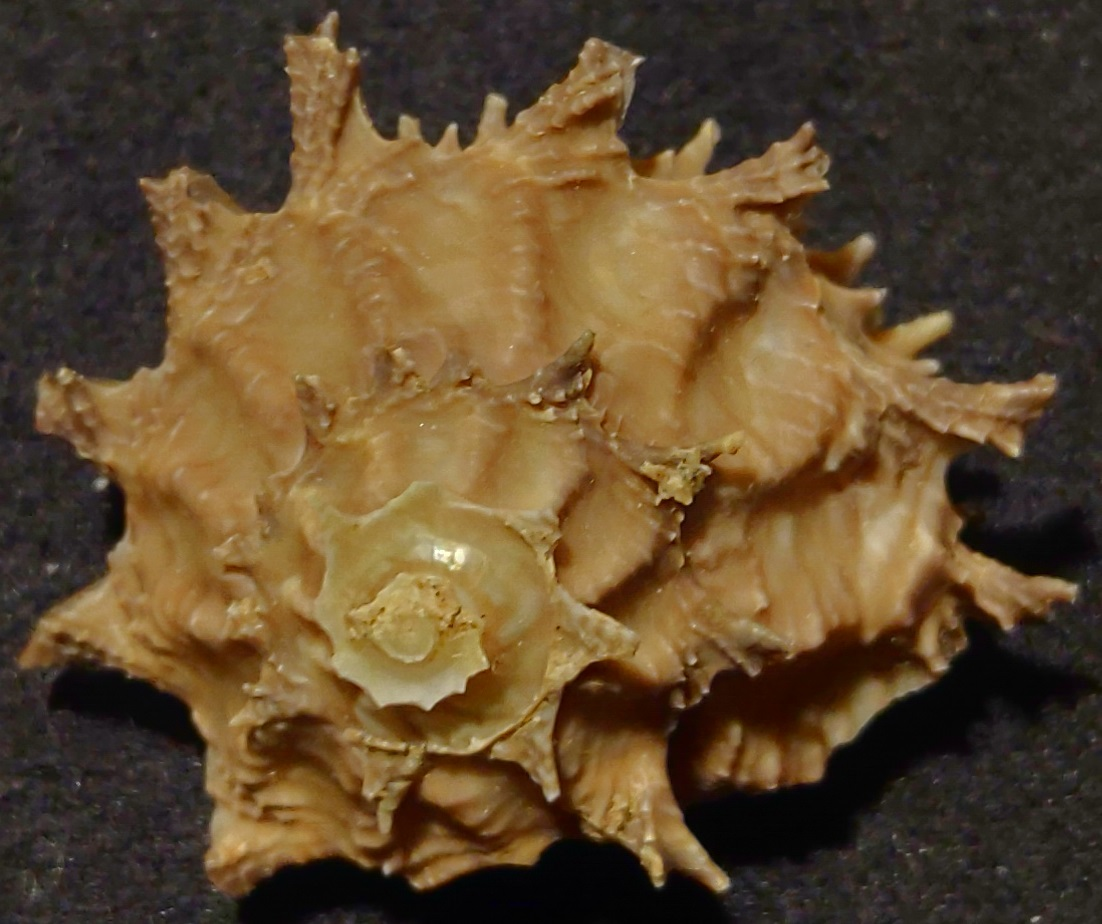

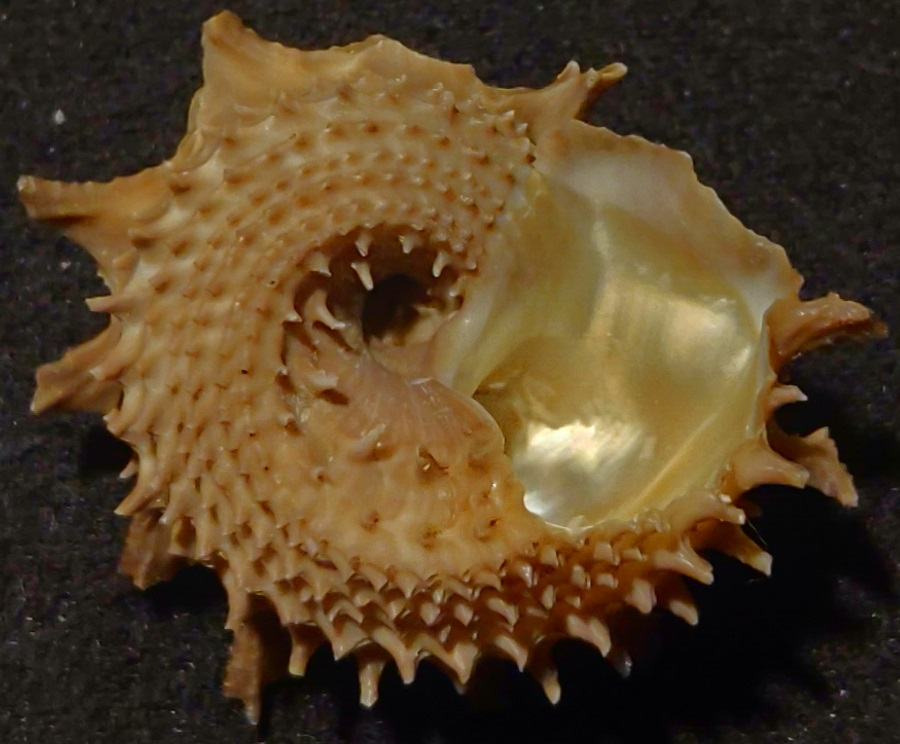

Angaria javanica is a species of sea snail, a marine gastropod mollusk in the family Angariidae.

== Description ==
The shell can grow to be 35 mm in length.

== Distribution ==
Angaria javanica can be found off of Java, Indonesia.
