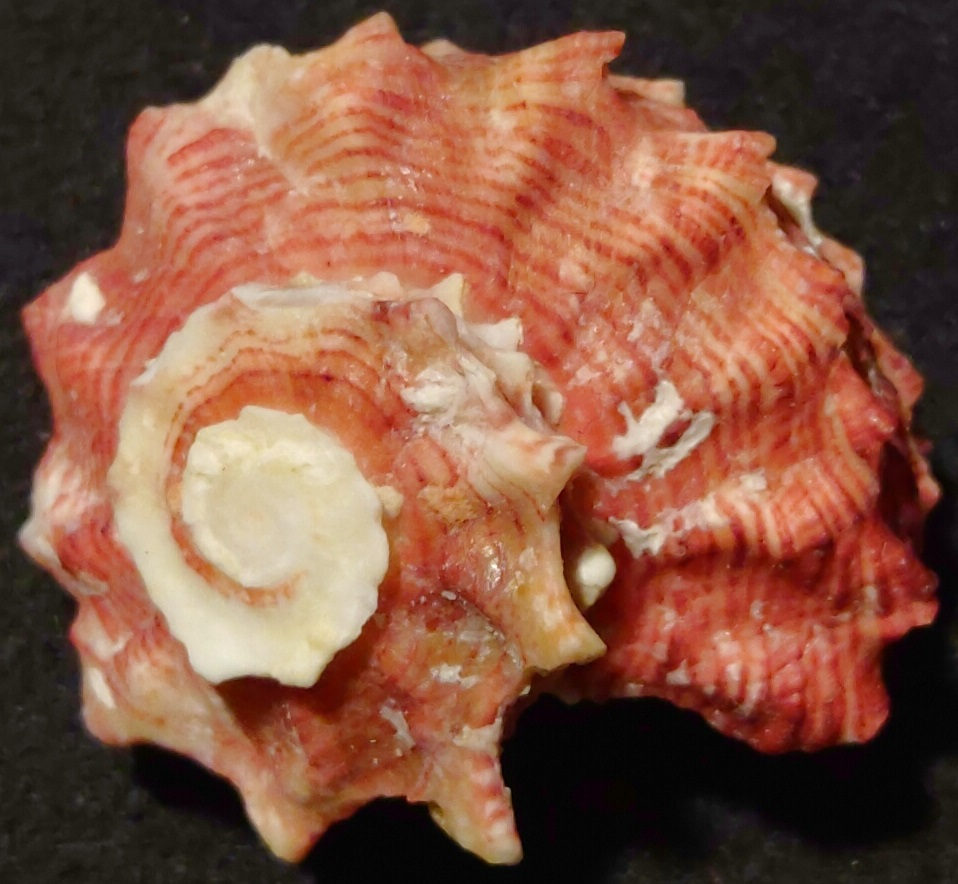

Scientific classification
- Kingdom: Animalia
- Phylum: Mollusca
- Class: Gastropoda
- Subclass: Vetigastropoda
- Order: Trochida
- Family: Angariidae
- Genus: Angaria
- Species: A. rugosa

Binomial name
- Angaria rugosa (Kiener, 1873)

Synonyms
- Delphinula rugosa Kiener, 1873

= Angaria rugosa =

Species of gastropod

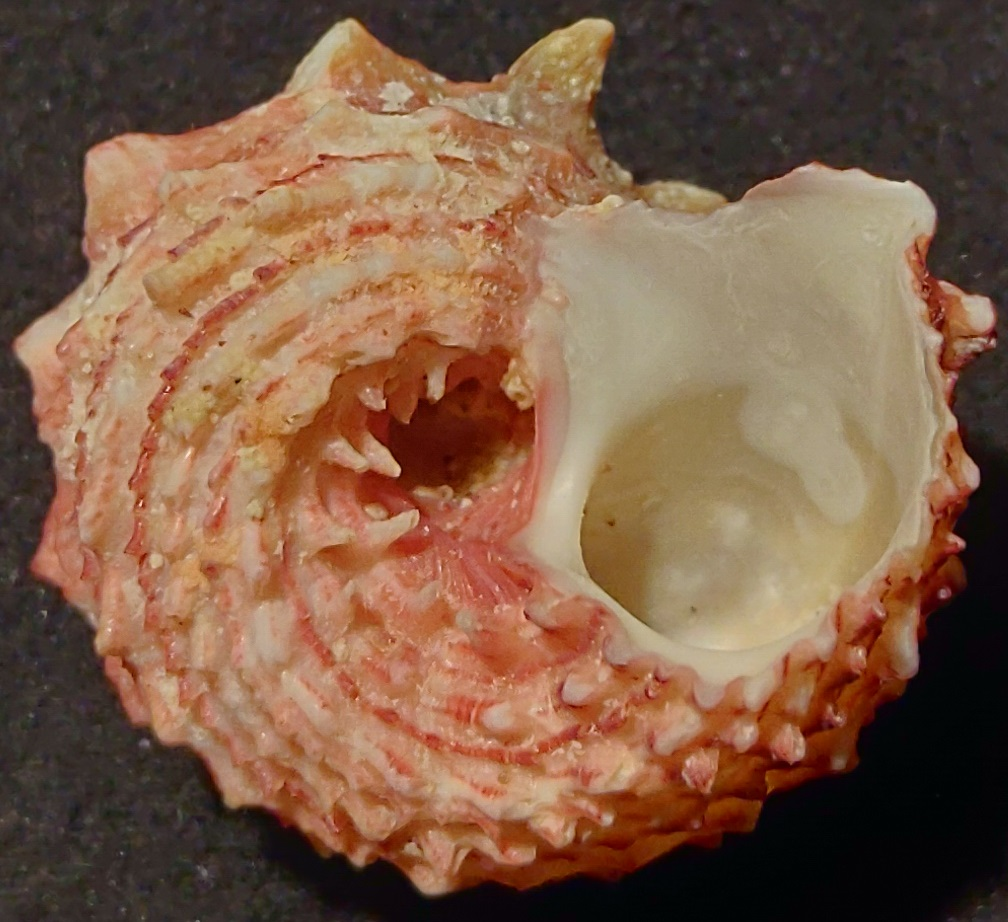

Angaria rugosa is a species of sea snail, a marine gastropod mollusk in the family Angariidae.

It has also been known as "Delphinus ruber distortus", "Turbo delphinus", "Turbo distortus", "Angaria distorta", and "Delphinula distorta".

== Description ==
The shell can grow to be 25 mm to 46 mm in length.

Angaria rugosa has a dark red color, fine scales on the surface, and usually no large spines on the upper peripheral ridge.

== Distribution ==
Angaria rugosa can be found majorly on the shores of East India down to Vietnam and also offshores of the Philippines.

It lives in shallow water, from intertidal to several meters in depth.

This species is limited to the Indian Ocean, it is known from southern India, Sri Lanka, the Nicobar Islands, and from western Thailand.

== Related species ==
It has occurred in the same area as Angaria lilianae.
