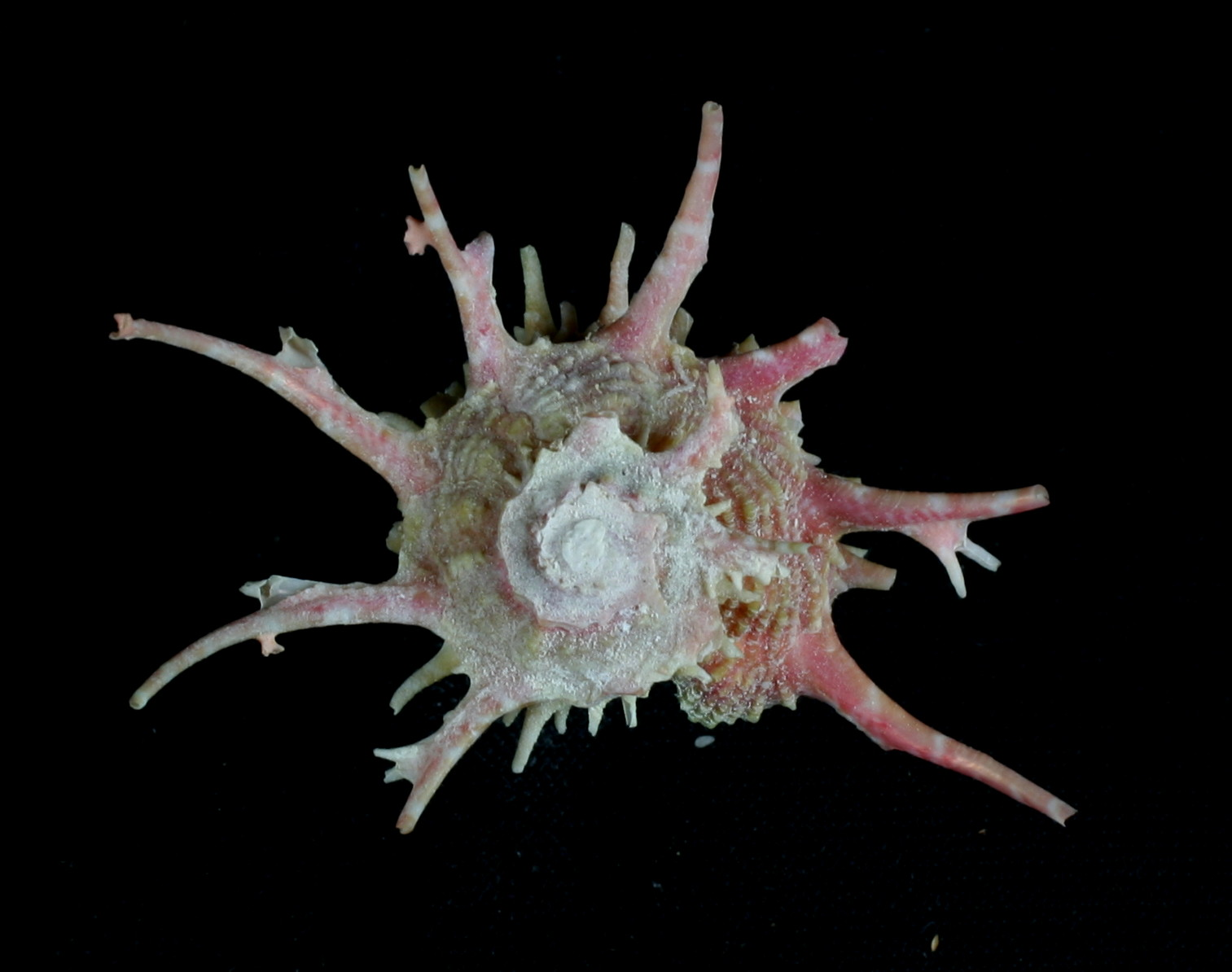
- Angaria vicdani

Scientific classification
- Kingdom: Animalia
- Phylum: Mollusca
- Class: Gastropoda
- Subclass: Vetigastropoda
- Order: Trochida
- Superfamily: Trochoidea
- Family: Angariidae
- Genus: Angaria; Röding, 1798

Type species
- Turbo delphinus Linnaeus, 1758

Synonyms
- Angaria (Angaria) Röding, 1798· accepted, alternate representation; † Angaria (Pseudoninella) Sacco, 1896 · accepted, alternate representation; Angarina Bayle, 1878; Angarus Gray, 1857; Cochlus Humphrey, 1779; Delphinula Lamarck, 1804; Delphinulopsis Wright, 1878; Delphinulus Montfort, 1810; Praxidice Rafinesque, 1815; Scalator Gistel, 1848; Trochus (Delphinula) Lamarck, 1804

= Angaria (gastropod) =

Genus of gastropods

Angaria is a genus of sea snails, marine gastropod mollusks in the family Angariidae. Angaria is the only genus in the family Angariidae.

== Taxonomy ==
According to the taxonomy of the Gastropoda by Bouchet & Rocroi, 2005, Angaria belongs in the subfamily Angariinae, within the family Turbinidae. Williams et al. (2008) moved Angaria to the family Angariidae within the newly created superfamily Angarioidea.

== Species ==
Species in the genus Angaria include:

- Angaria aculeata (Reeve, 1843)
- Angaria carmencita Günther, 2007
- Angaria chiapponii Poppe & Tagaro, 2026
- † Angaria complanata Gain, Belliard & Le Renard, 2018
- † Angaria constantinensis Gain, Belliard & Le Renard, 2018
- Angaria delphinus (Linnaeus, 1758)
- † Angaria dalmadeakae Kovács et al., 2026
- Angaria formosa (Reeve, 1843)
- Angaria fratrummonsecourorum Günther, 2013
- Angaria guntheri Thach, 2018
- † Angaria gwynae Allison, 1955
- † Angaria gymna (Cossmann & Pissarro, 1902)
- Angaria javanica K. Monsecour & D. Monsecour, 1999
- Angaria kronenbergi Thach, 2018
- Angaria lilianae (K. Monsecour & D. Monsecour, 2000) Published in GloriaMaris.
- Angaria loebbeckei (Günther, 2022)
- Angaria melanacantha (Reeve, 1842)
- Angaria monsecourorum Thach, 2016
- Angaria moolenbeeki Thach, 2018
- Angaria nasui Thach, 2016
- Angaria neglecta Poppe & Goto, 1993
- Angaria neocaledonica Günther, 2016
- Angaria nhatrangensis Dekker, 2006
- † Angaria nigellensis Gain, Belliard & Le Renard, 2018
- Angaria nodosa (Reeve, 1843)
- † Angaria pakistanica Eames, 1952
- Angaria petuchi Thach, 2018
- † Angaria polyphylla (d'Orbigny, 1850)
- Angaria poppei (K. Monsecour & D. Monsecour, 1999)
- † Angaria proviliacensis Pacaud, 2017
- † Angaria regleyana (Deshayes, 1824)
- † Angaria reynieri (Cossmann, 1913)
- Angaria rubrovaria Günther, 2016
- Angaria rugosa (Kiener, 1873)
- Angaria scalospinosa Günther, 2016
- † Angaria scobina (Brongniart, 1823)
- † Angaria scutellata Gain, Belliard & Le Renard, 2018
- Angaria sphaerula (L. C. Kiener, 1839)
- † Angaria subcalcar D'Orbigny, 1850
- Angaria turpini K. Monsecour & D. Monsecour, 2006
- Angaria tyria (Reeve, 1842)
- Angaria vicdani (S. Kosuge, 1980)
- Angaria walleri Thach, 2018

Species brought into synonymy

- Angaria atrata (Gmelin, 1791) : synonym of Euchelus atratus (Gmelin, 1791)
- Angaria distorta (Linnaeus, 1758) : synonym of Angaria delphinus (Linnaeus, 1758)
- Angaria doncieuxi Villatte, 1964 † : synonym of Angaria subcalcar (d'Orbigny, 1850) †
- Angaria evoluta (L. Reeve, 1843) : synonym of Liotia evoluta (L. Reeve, 1843)
- Angaria laciniata (Lamarck, 1816), synonym of Angaria delphinus (Linnaeus, 1758)
- Angaria lacunosa Barnard, 1963 : synonym of Stephopoma lacunosum (Barnard, 1963) (original combination)
- Angaria plicata (Kiener, 1838) : synonym of Angaria rugosa (Kiener, 1838)
- Angaria valensis Plaziat, 1970 † : synonym of Angaria subcalcar (d'Orbigny, 1850) †
