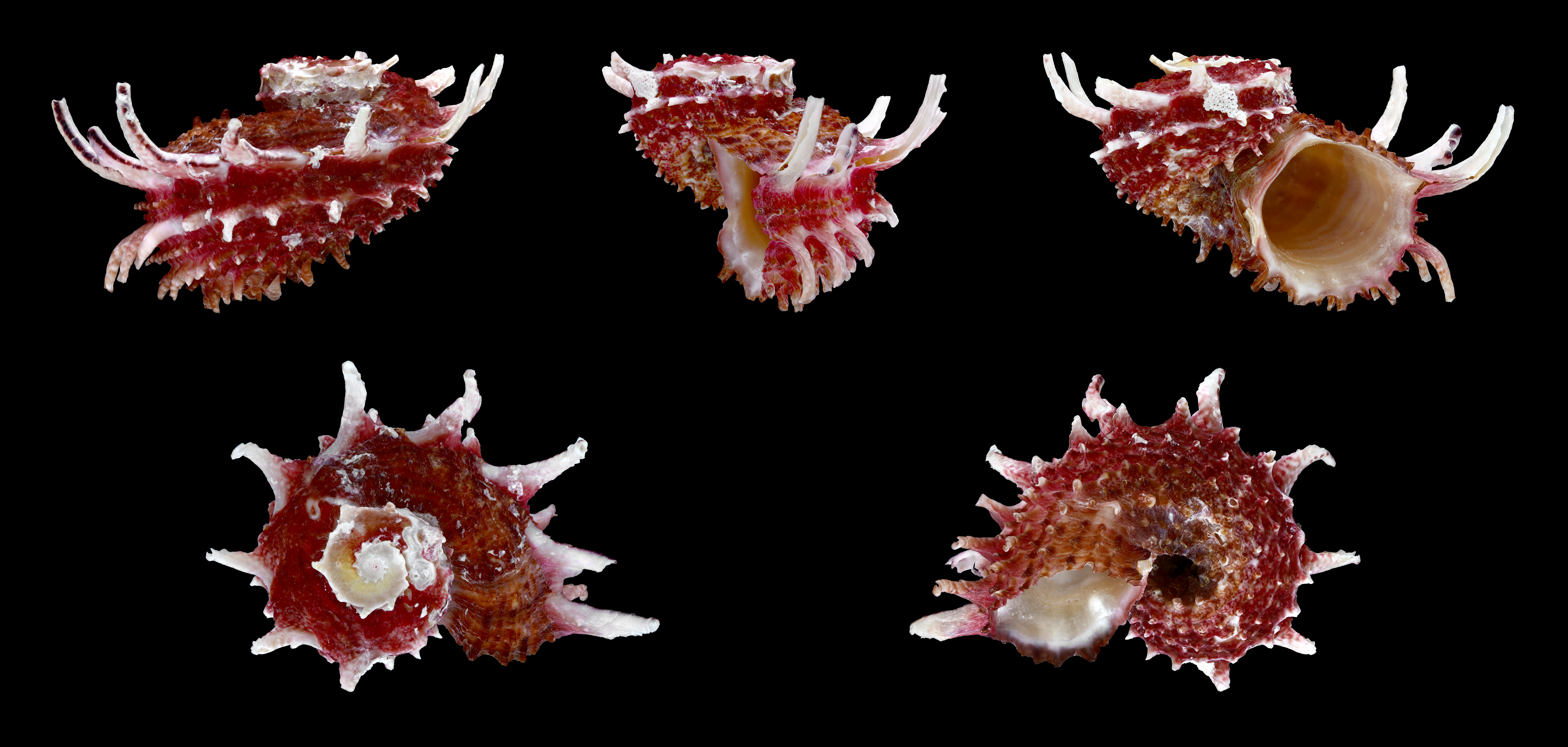
- Five views of a shell of Angaria poppei

Scientific classification
- Kingdom: Animalia
- Phylum: Mollusca
- Class: Gastropoda
- Subclass: Vetigastropoda
- Order: Trochida
- Family: Angariidae
- Genus: Angaria
- Species: A. poppei

Binomial name
- Angaria poppei (Monsecour, K. & D. Monsecour, 1999)

= Angaria poppei =

Species of gastropod

Angaria poppei is a species of sea snail, a marine gastropod mollusk in the family Angariidae.

== Description ==
The shell can grow to be 28 mm to 65 mm in length.

== Distribution ==
Angaria poppei can be found off of the Philippines, Indonesia, and Malaysia.
