= Angaria carmencita =

Scientific classification
- Kingdom: Animalia
- Phylum: Mollusca
- Class: Gastropoda
- Subclass: Vetigastropoda
- Order: Trochida
- Family: Angariidae
- Genus: Angaria
- Species: A. carmencita

Binomial name
- Angaria carmencita Günther, 2007

Species of gastropod

Angaria carmencita is a species of sea snail, a marine gastropod mollusk in the family Angariidae, part of the superfamily Trochoidea.

== Description ==
The shell can grow to be 40 mm to 70 mm.

== Distribution ==
Angaria carmencita can be found off of Thursday Island, North Queensland, and Australia.
