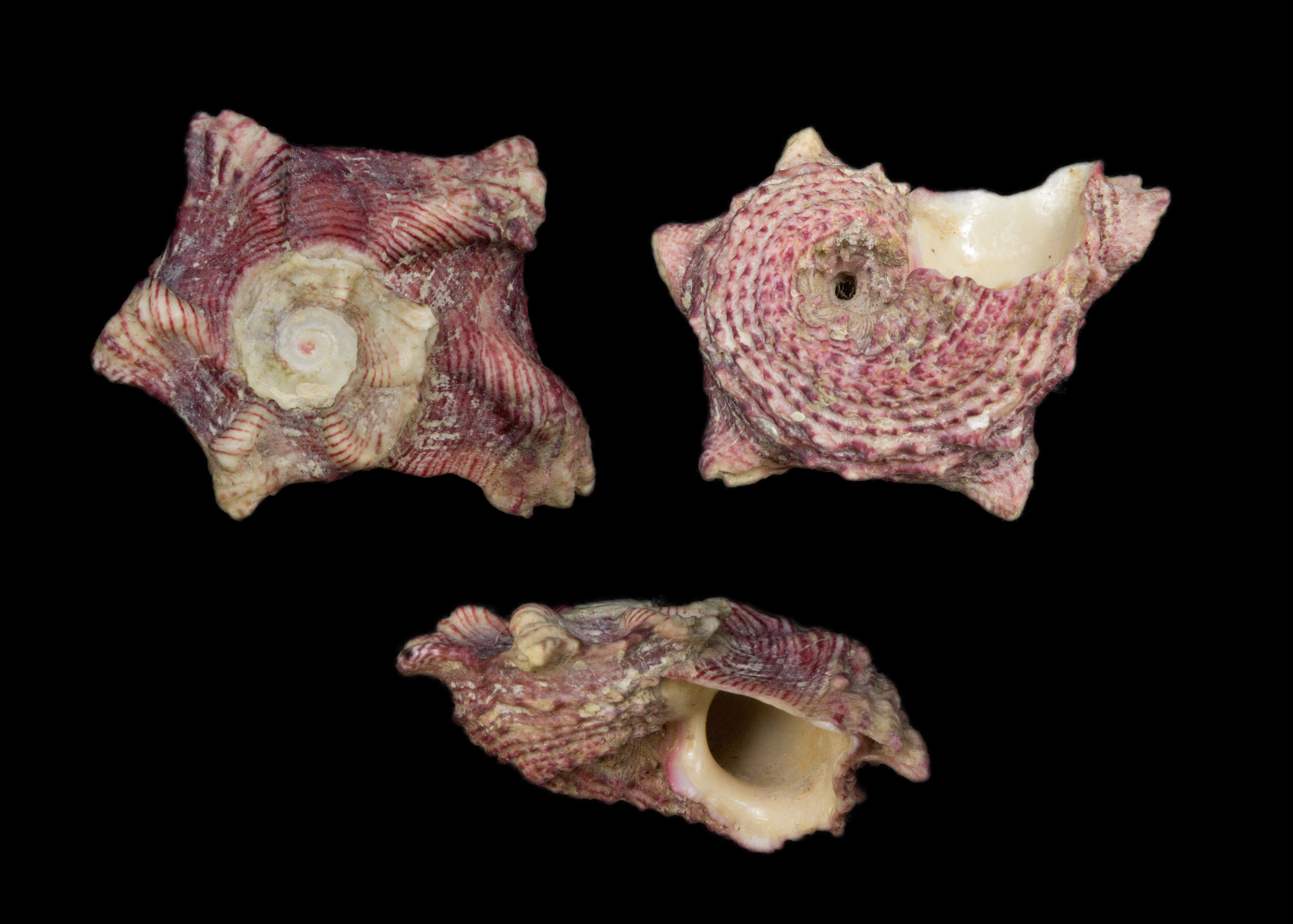
- Holotype of Angaria loebbecke

Scientific classification
- Kingdom: Animalia
- Phylum: Mollusca
- Class: Gastropoda
- Subclass: Vetigastropoda
- Order: Trochida
- Superfamily: Trochoidea
- Family: Angariidae
- Genus: Angaria
- Species: A. loebbeckei

Binomial name
- Angaria loebbeckei Günther, 2022

= Angaria loebbeckei =

Species of gastropod

Angaria loebbeckei is a species of sea snail, a marine gastropod mollusk in the family Angariidae. It was discovered and described in 2022 based on only four specimens, which are part of both private and museum collections. In honour of the shell collector Theodor Löbbecke, who would have celebrated its 200th birthday in 2021, the new species was named after him. The holotype is preserved in the Aquazoo Löbbecke Museum in Düsseldorf, Germany, which houses the collection started by Theodor Löbbecke.

== Description ==
Angaria loebbeckei is a rather small snail growing up to 25 to 30 mm. Günther (2022) describes the spire of the shell as quite low to moderately high. The shoulder of the shell is straight or wavy/knobby. The spines are variable from totally absent to long and straight. The colour is also rather variable, overall as carmine red with a pink or white background and dark red spines (if present).

== Distribution and habitat ==
Angaria loebbeckei can be found in the ocean around Nicobar Islands, India and Sri Lanka, presumably in rather shallow water.
