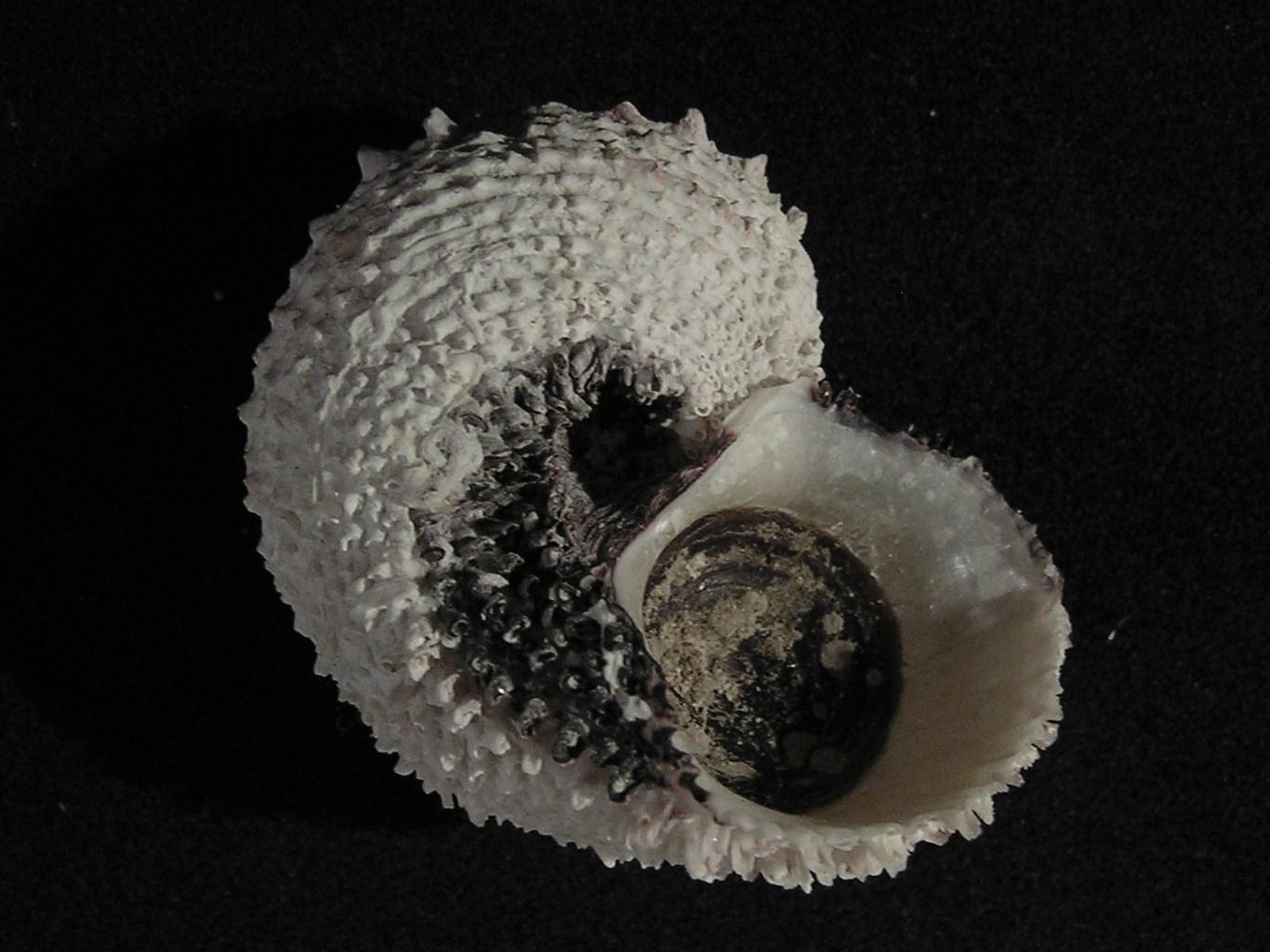
- Apertural view of a shell of Angaria tyria

Scientific classification
- Kingdom: Animalia
- Phylum: Mollusca
- Class: Gastropoda
- Subclass: Vetigastropoda
- Order: Trochida
- Family: Angariidae
- Genus: Angaria
- Species: A. tyria

Binomial name
- Angaria tyria (Reeve, 1842)

Synonyms
- Delphinula tyria Reeve, 1842

= Angaria tyria =

Species of gastropod

Angaria tyria is a species of sea snail, a marine gastropod mollusk in the family Angariidae.

== Description ==
The shell can grow to be 40 mm to 70 mm in length.

== Distribution ==
Angaria tyria can be found in the Southwest Pacific Ocean and off of West Australia.
