= Aquazoo Löbbecke Museum =

Coordinates: 51°15′23″N 6°44′59″E

Aquazoo Löbbecke Museum, Düsseldorf
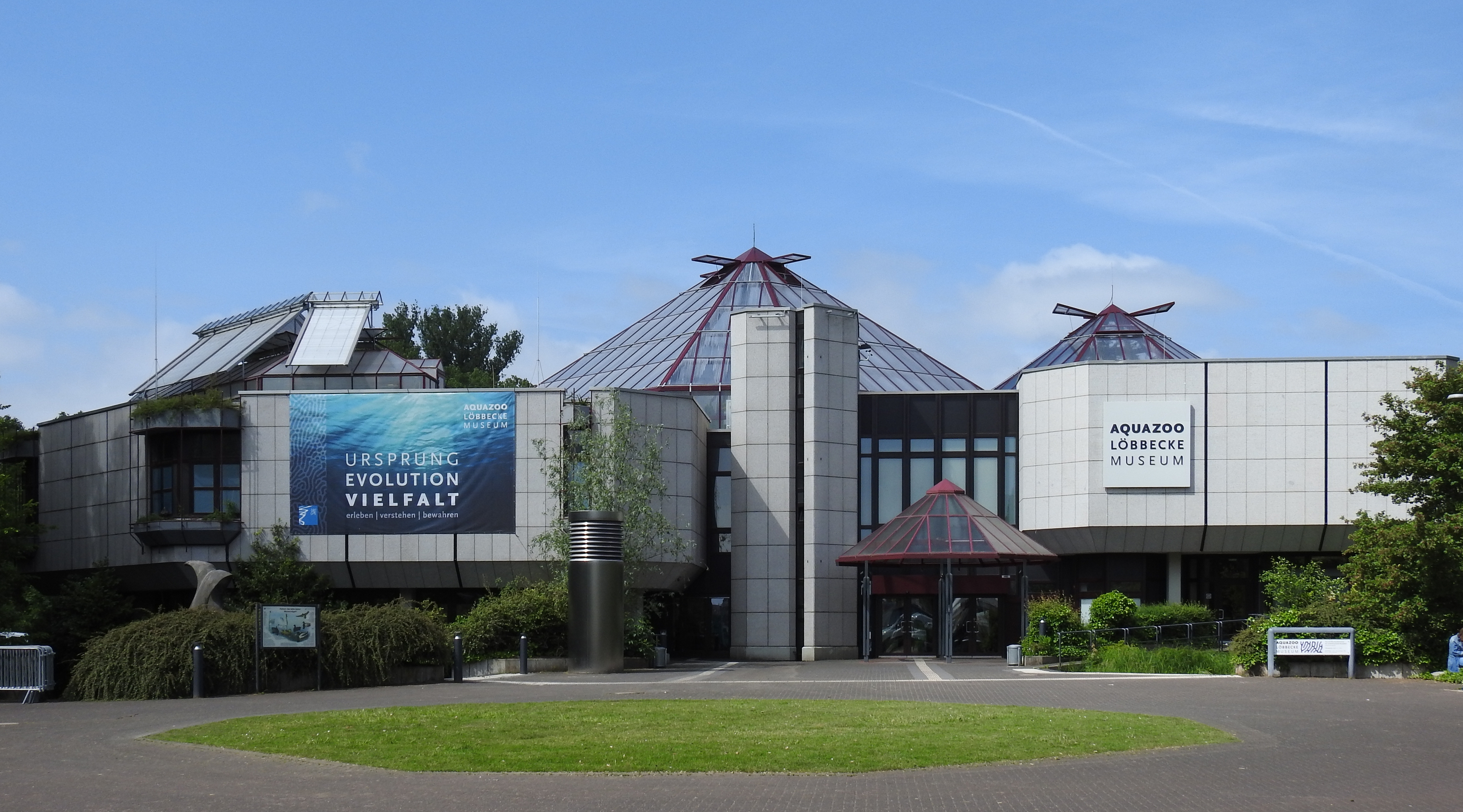
- Established: 1904
- Location: Kaiserswerther Straße 380; 40474 Düsseldorf, Germany
- Type: Natural history museum Zoo Aquarium
- Visitors: c. 400.000 annually
- Director: Jochen Reiter
- Website: www.duesseldorf.de/aquazoo.html

The Aquazoo Löbbecke Museum unites Zoo, Natural History Museum and Aquarium in one institution under the administration of the city of Düsseldorf. It was opened in 1987 in the North Park under the name "Löbbecke-Museum + Aquazoo" (there have been precursor institutions on different locations in Düsseldorf though). On an area of about 2000 square meters, around 500 animal species are exhibited in 25 themed rooms in aquariums, terrariums and a tropical hall. Moreover, the exhibition includes 1,400 natural history exhibits, models and interactive stations. With about 400.000 visitors per year, the Aquazoo Löbbecke Museum has been by far the most visited cultural institution in the city of Düsseldorf for many years. The name of the institution refers to Theodor Löbbecke who laid the foundation of the natural history collection by collecting sea shells. The collection is rich in type material for different mollusc species, such as the Angaria loebbeckei and Chicoreus loebbeckei.
