= Angaria lilianae =

Scientific classification
- Kingdom: Animalia
- Phylum: Mollusca
- Class: Gastropoda
- Subclass: Vetigastropoda
- Order: Trochida
- Family: Angariidae
- Genus: Angaria
- Species: A. lilianae

Binomial name
- Angaria lilianae K.Monsecour & D.Monsecour, 2000

Species of gastropod

Angaria lilianae is a species of marine mollusk in the family of Angariidae.

It has been found near Thailand, off the coast of the Racha Islands.

It has been found at 20 to 25 meters in depth.

== Appearance ==
Its width is on the order of 30 millimeters long.

It has a slight pink tint. Its shell has a spiral shape. It has white posterior spines.

== Related ==
Angaria lilianae has been found in the same area as Angaria rugosa.
