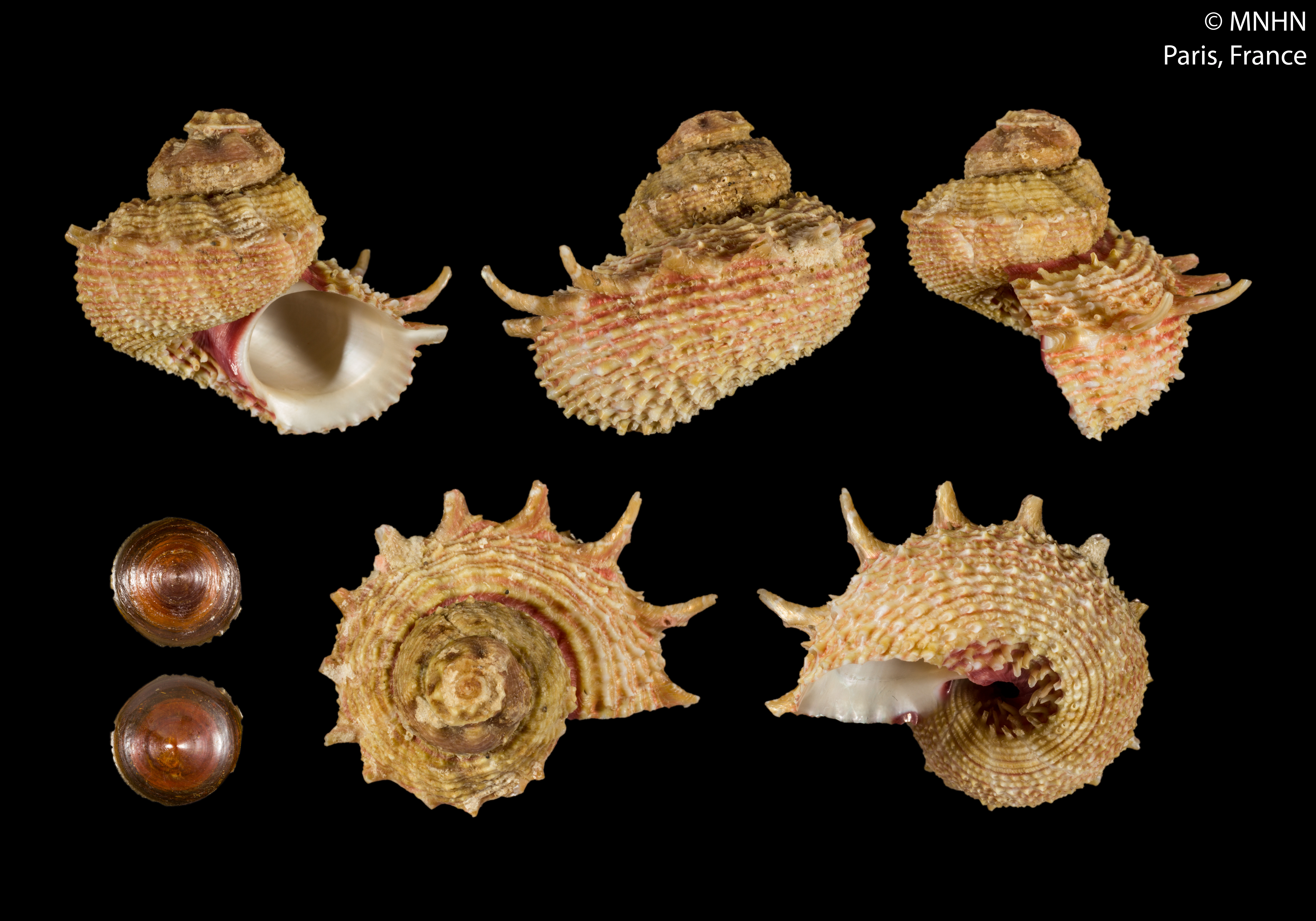
- The shell of the Angaria turpini (holotype at MNHN, Paris)

Scientific classification
- Kingdom: Animalia
- Phylum: Mollusca
- Class: Gastropoda
- Subclass: Vetigastropoda
- Order: Trochida
- Family: Angariidae
- Genus: Angaria
- Species: A. turpini

Binomial name
- Angaria turpini K. Monsecour & D. Monsecour, 2006

= Angaria turpini =

Species of gastropod

Angaria turpini is a species of sea snail, a marine gastropod mollusk in the family Angariidae.

== Distribution ==
This marine species occurs off New Caledonia.

== See also ==
- Angaria (gastropod)
