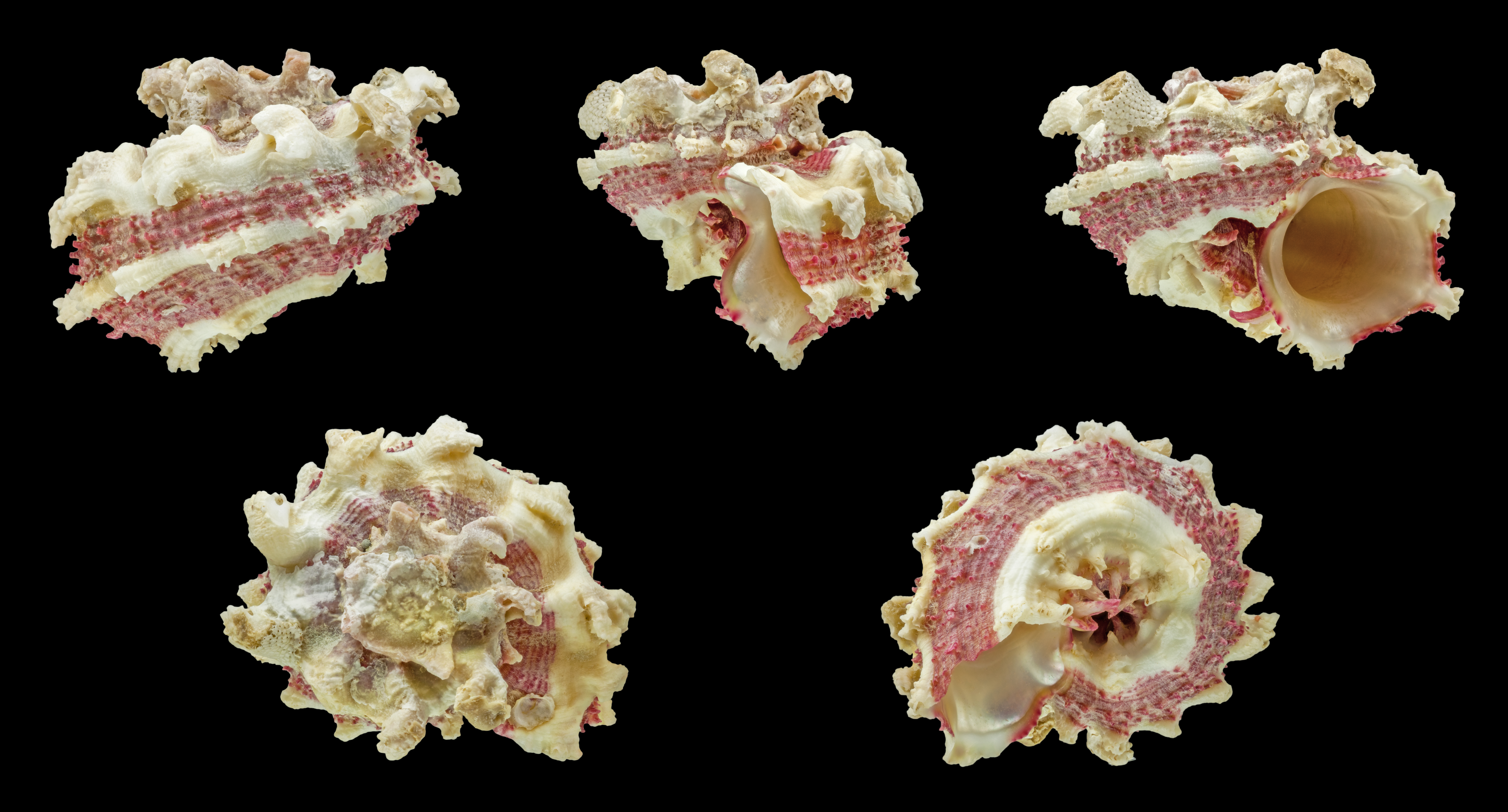

Scientific classification
- Kingdom: Animalia
- Phylum: Mollusca
- Class: Gastropoda
- Subclass: Vetigastropoda
- Order: Trochida
- Superfamily: Trochoidea
- Family: Angariidae
- Genus: Angaria
- Species: A. aculeata

Binomial name
- Angaria aculeata (Reeve, 1843)

Synonyms
- Delphinula aculeata Reeve, 1843

= Angaria aculeata =

Species of gastropod

Angaria aculeata is a species of sea snail, a marine gastropod mollusk in the family Angariidae.

== Description ==
The shell can grow to be 20 mm to 50 mm in length. The shell consists of long, branched, downward-pointing ridges. The color is predominantly red, with ridges either darker (black) or lighter (white). The spire is very short and suddenly becomes small.

== Distribution ==
Angaria aculeata can be found off of the Philippines and Japan.
