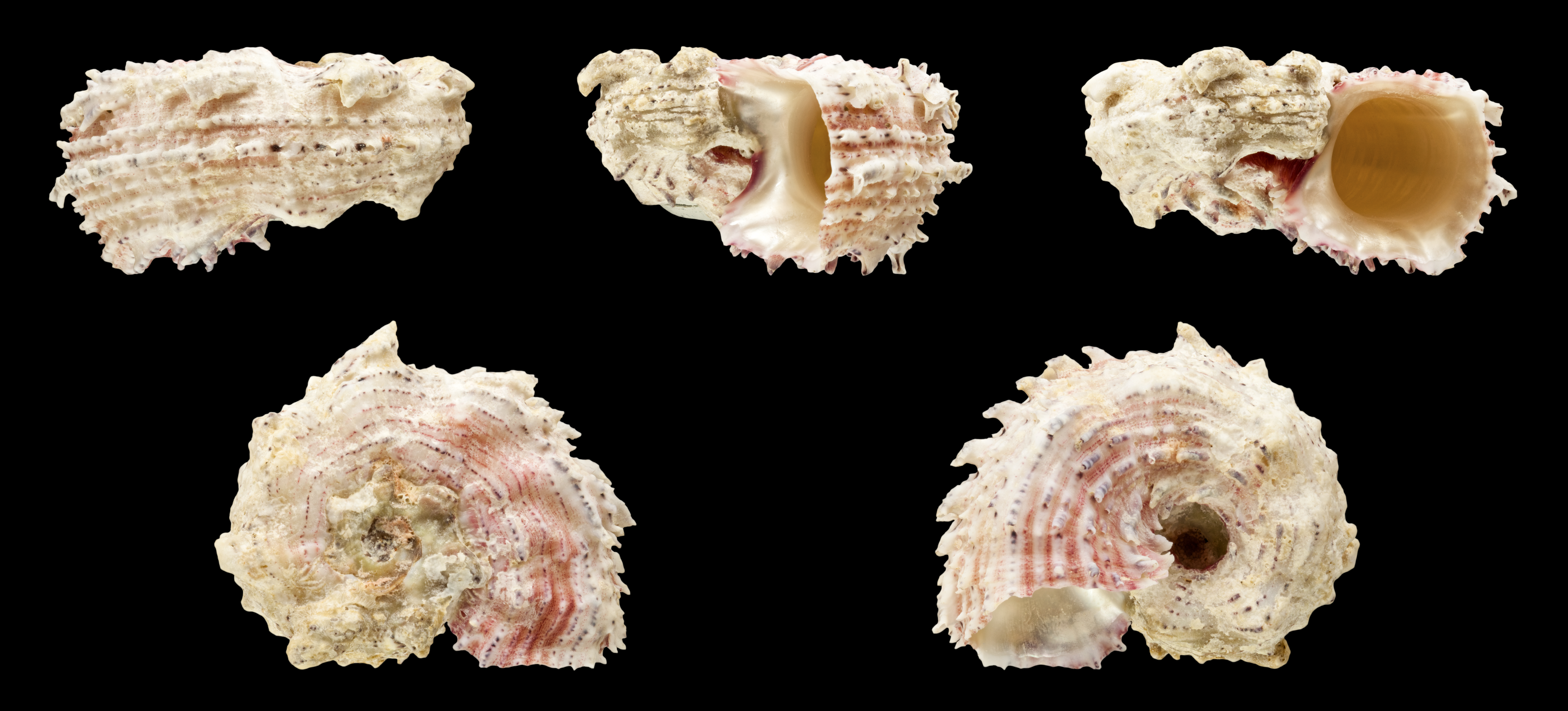

Scientific classification
- Kingdom: Animalia
- Phylum: Mollusca
- Class: Gastropoda
- Subclass: Vetigastropoda
- Order: Trochida
- Family: Angariidae
- Genus: Angaria
- Species: A. nodosa

Binomial name
- Angaria nodosa (Reeve, 1842)

Synonyms
- Delphinula nodosa Reeve, 1842

= Angaria nodosa =

Species of gastropod

Angaria nodosa is a species of sea snail, a marine gastropod mollusk in the family Angariidae.
