= Angaria formosa =

Scientific classification
- Kingdom: Animalia
- Phylum: Mollusca
- Class: Gastropoda
- Subclass: Vetigastropoda
- Order: Trochida
- Family: Angariidae
- Genus: Angaria
- Species: A. formosa

Binomial name
- Angaria formosa (Reeve, 1843)

Synonyms
- Angaria delphinus f. formosa (Reeve, 1842); Delphinula formosa Reeve, 1843 (original combination)

Species of gastropod

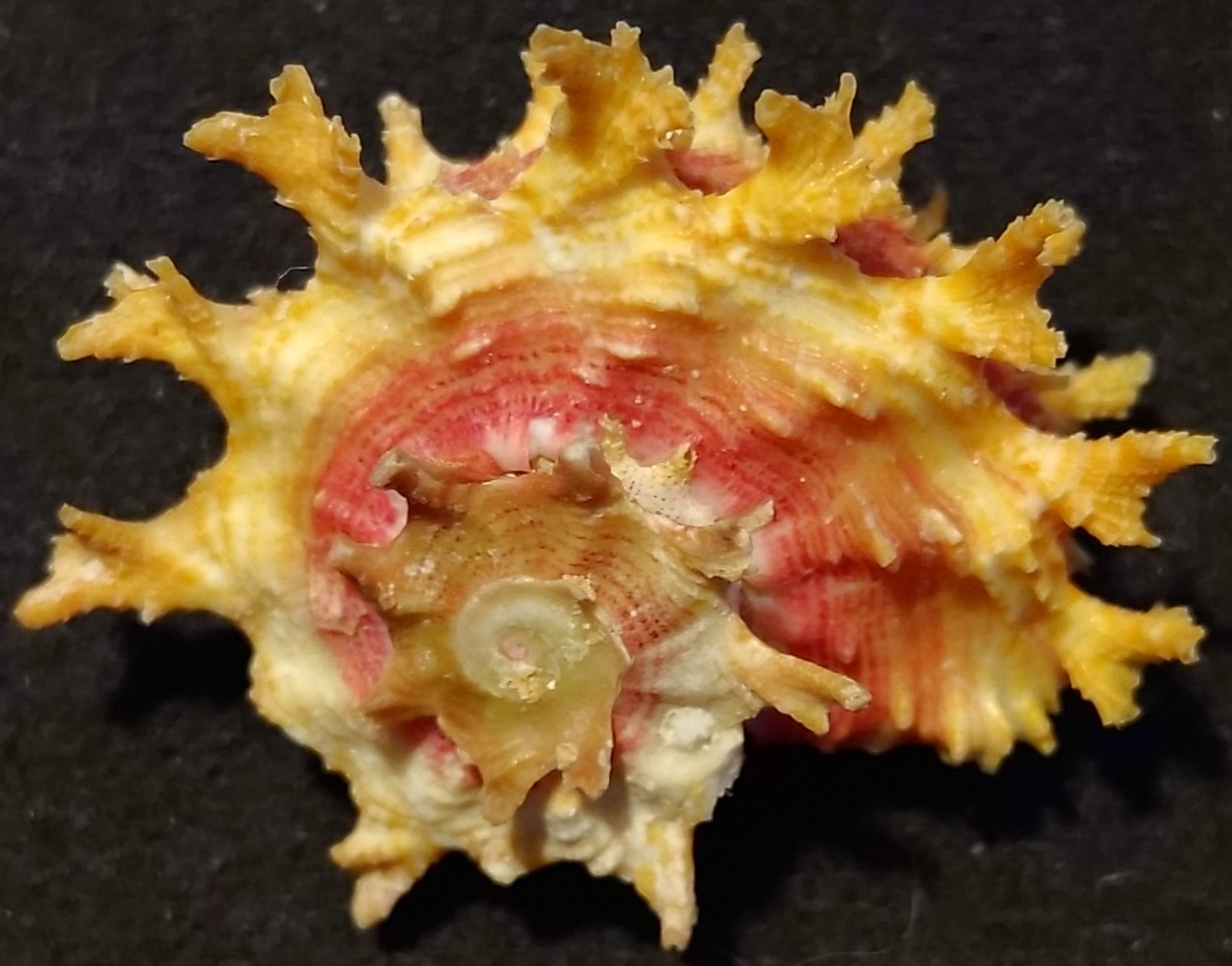

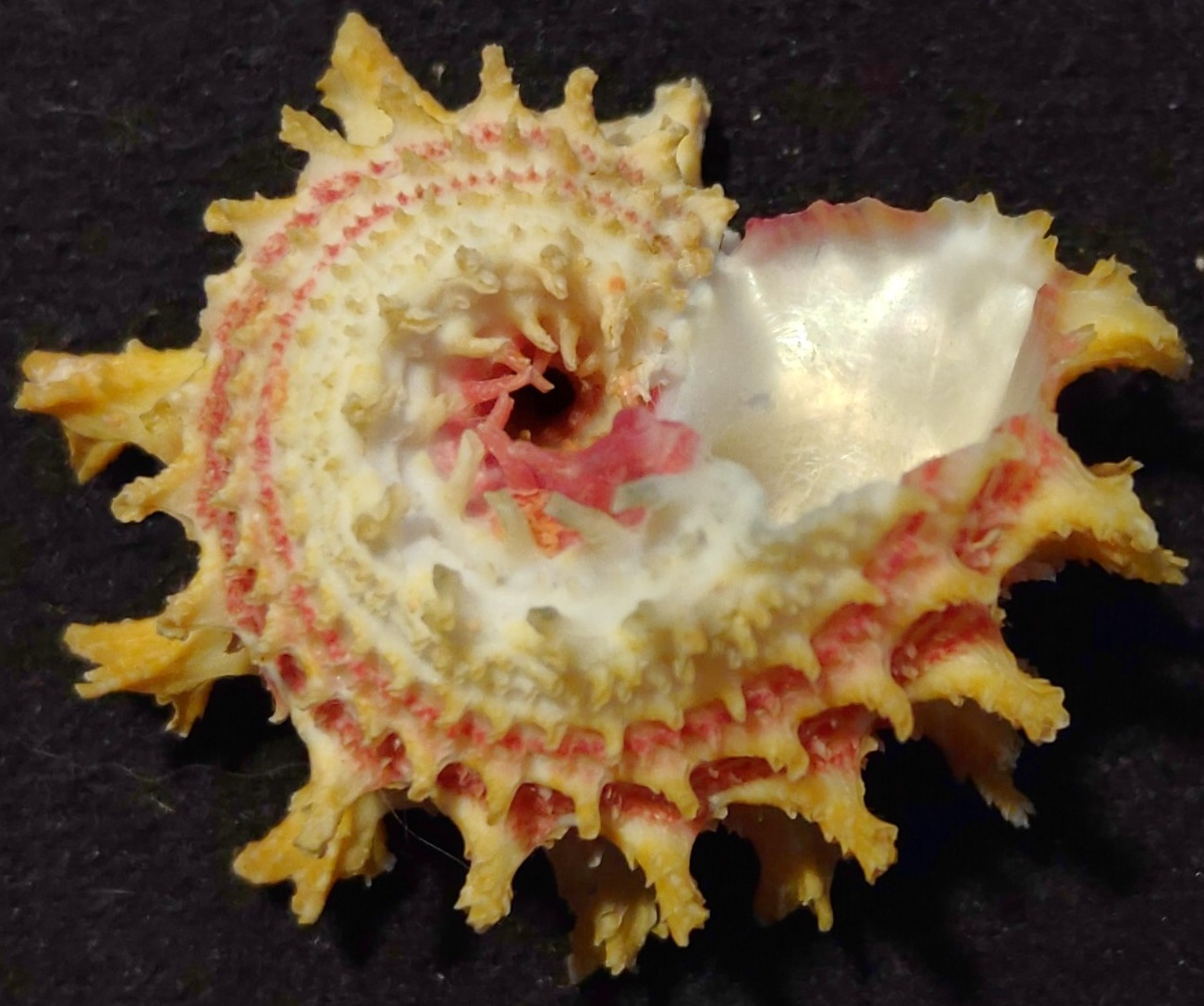

Angaria formosa is a species of sea snail, a marine gastropod mollusk in the family Angariidae.

== Description ==
The shell can grow to be 24 mm to 65 mm in length.

== Distribution ==
Angaria formosa can be found off of the Philippines and Japan.
