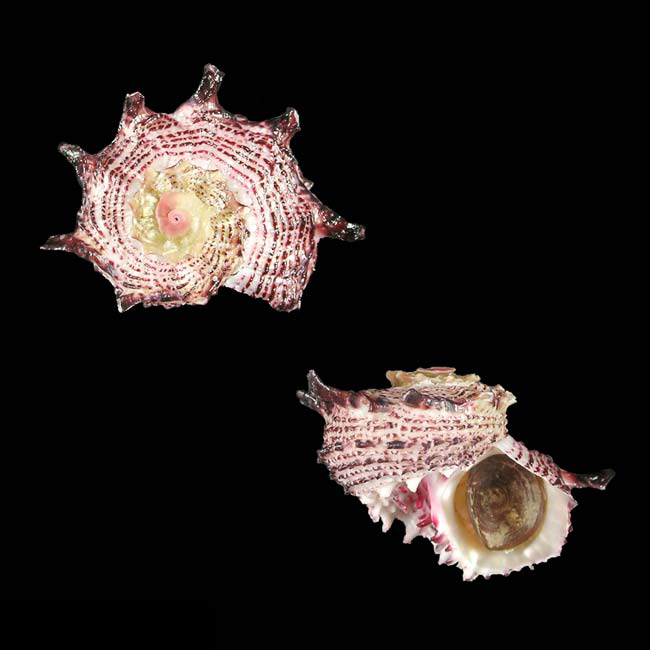

Scientific classification
- Kingdom: Animalia
- Phylum: Mollusca
- Class: Gastropoda
- Subclass: Vetigastropoda
- Order: Trochida
- Family: Angariidae
- Genus: Angaria
- Species: A. neglecta

Binomial name
- Angaria neglecta Poppe & Goto, 1993

= Angaria neglecta =

Species of gastropod

Angaria neglecta is a species of sea snail, a marine gastropod mollusk in the family Angariidae.

== Description ==
The shell can grow to be 40 mm in length.

== Distribution ==
Angaria neglecta can be found from Japan to Australia.

== Original description ==
- Poppe G.T. & Goto Y. (1993) Recent Angariidae. Ancona: Informatore Piceno. 32 pls, 10 pls.
