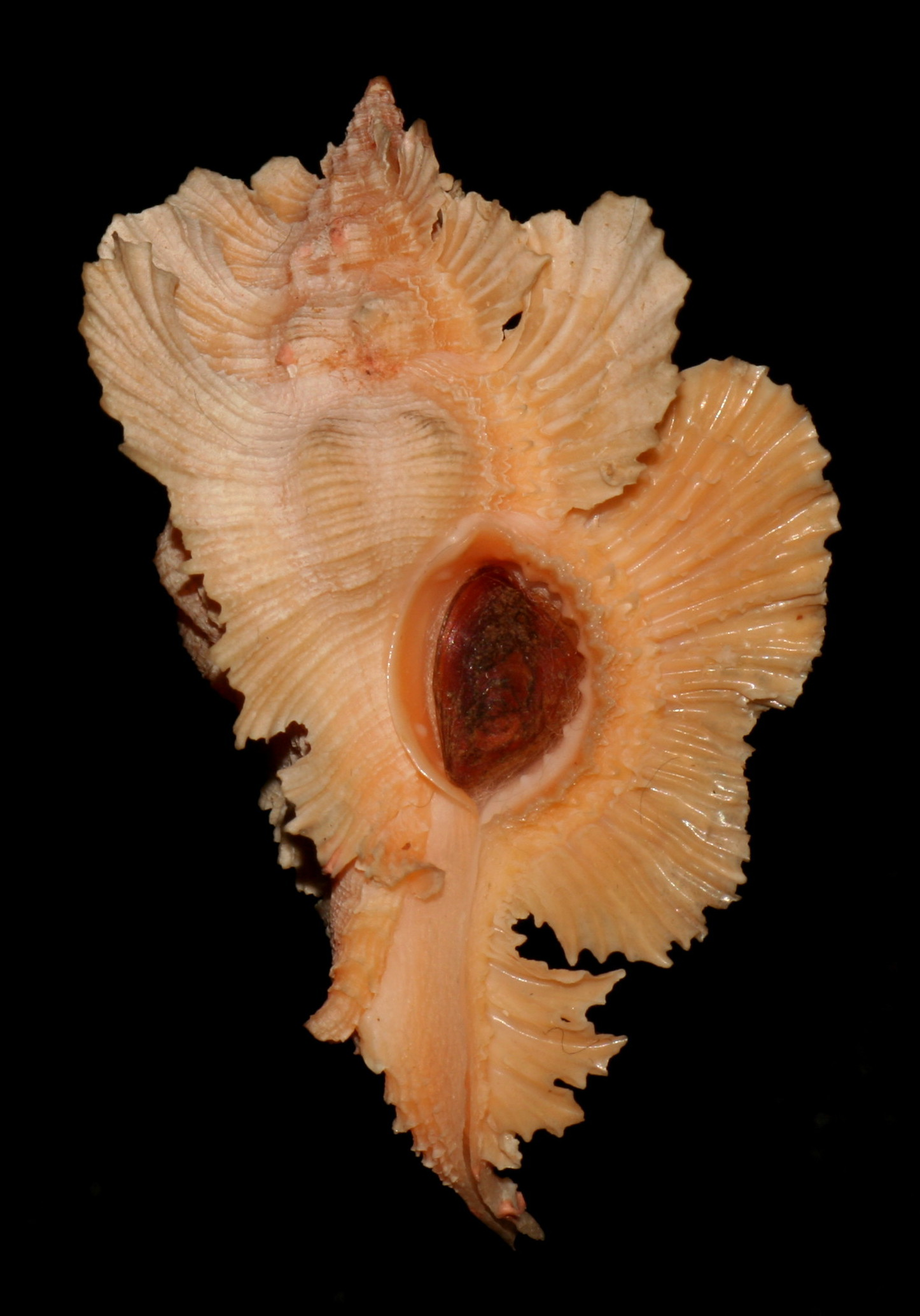
- Gastropod shell of Chicoreus loebbeckei with operculum, 44.7 mm in length, collected with gill nets at 100 m off Balut Island, Mindanao, Philippines.

Scientific classification
- Kingdom: Animalia
- Phylum: Mollusca
- Class: Gastropoda
- Subclass: Caenogastropoda
- Order: Neogastropoda
- Family: Muricidae
- Genus: Chicoreus
- Species: C. loebbeckei

Binomial name
- Chicoreus loebbeckei (Kobelt, In Loebbecke & Kobelt, 1879)

Synonyms
- Chicoreus (Chicopinnatus) loebbeckei (Kobelt, 1879)· accepted, alternate representation; Murex (Pteronotus) loebbeckei Kobelt, in Loebbecke & Kobelt, 1879; Pterynotus (Pterynotus) loebbeckei (Kobelt, 1879); Pterynotus loebbeckei (Kobelt, 1879)

= Chicoreus loebbeckei =

Species of gastropod

Chicoreus loebbeckei is a species of sea snail, a marine gastropod mollusk in the family Muricidae, the murex snails or rock snails. The holotype for this species is preserved in the Aquazoo Löbbecke Museum in Düsseldorf, Germany.

== Description ==
Peter Dance (1969) said that the shell of Chicoreus loebbeckei was "the loveliest, most exquisite natural object he has ever seen." The shell is fairly uniform in color and is typically a pastel to bright orange, although white, pastel pink and yellow forms exist. There are 7 to 9 body whorls after the nuclear whorls, each whorl bearing three prominently protruding varices that are often referred to as wings, and six knobs evenly spaced so that there are two knobs between each varix. The shell has a scaley microsculpture and prominent spiral cords which give the shell a lacey appearance, and the prominent "wings" are wavy and smoother than the whorls. The siphonal canal also has a prominent "wing" similar to the varices after which the siphonal canal has a sharp recurved bend.

The aperture is subovate and the operculum is reddish brown. Adult size is from 35 mm to 80 mm in length. Larger shells have more prominent "wings" and have been loosely compared to tropical flowers.

== Distribution ==
This species occurs in the Indo-Pacific region, however it is most often found subtidally throughout the Philippines, in depths to 100 to 250 m.
