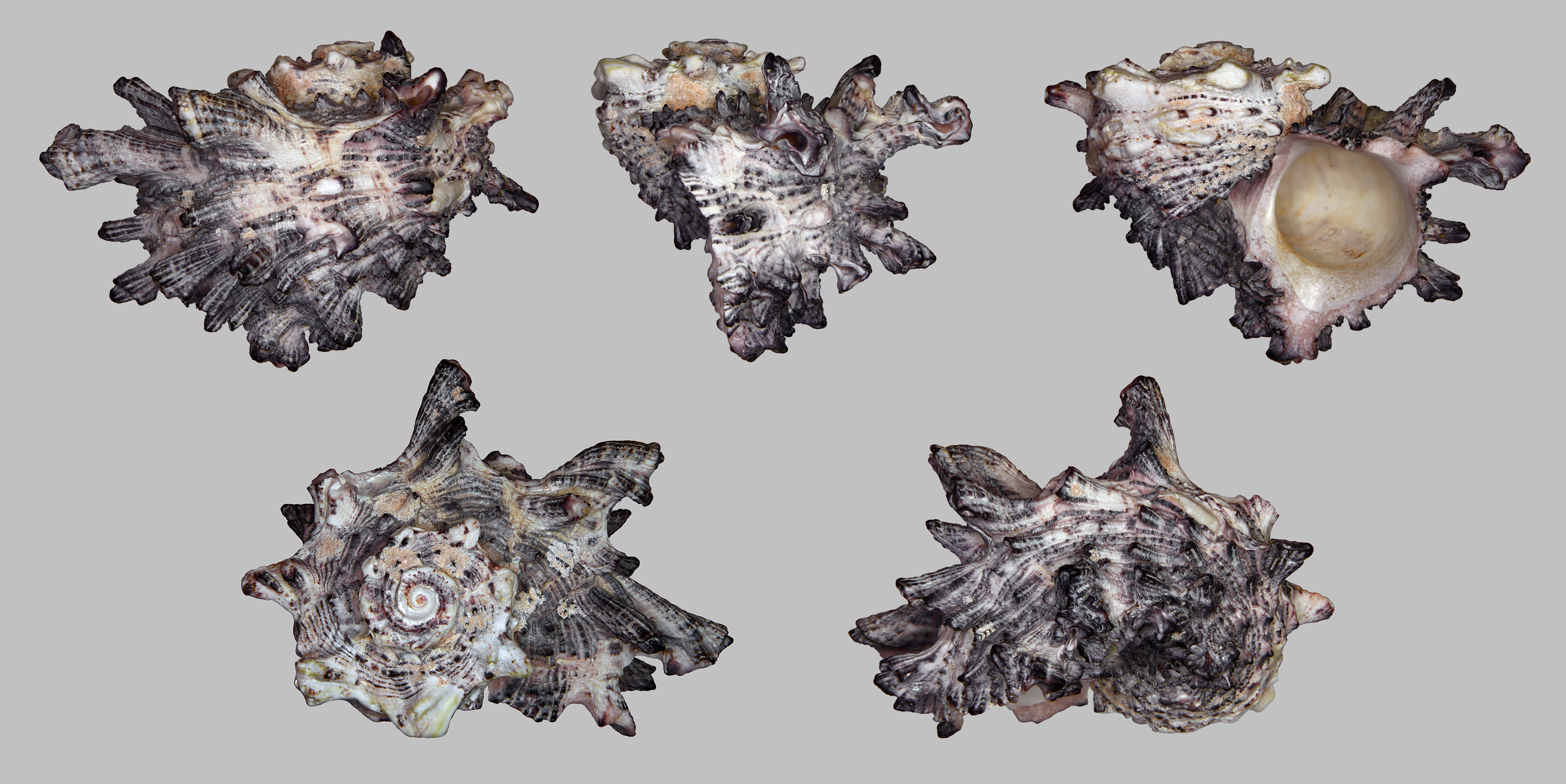
- Five views of a shell of Angaria delphinus

Scientific classification
- Kingdom: Animalia
- Phylum: Mollusca
- Class: Gastropoda
- Subclass: Vetigastropoda
- Order: Trochida
- Family: Angariidae
- Genus: Angaria
- Species: A. delphinus

Binomial name
- Angaria delphinus (Linnaeus, 1758)

Synonyms
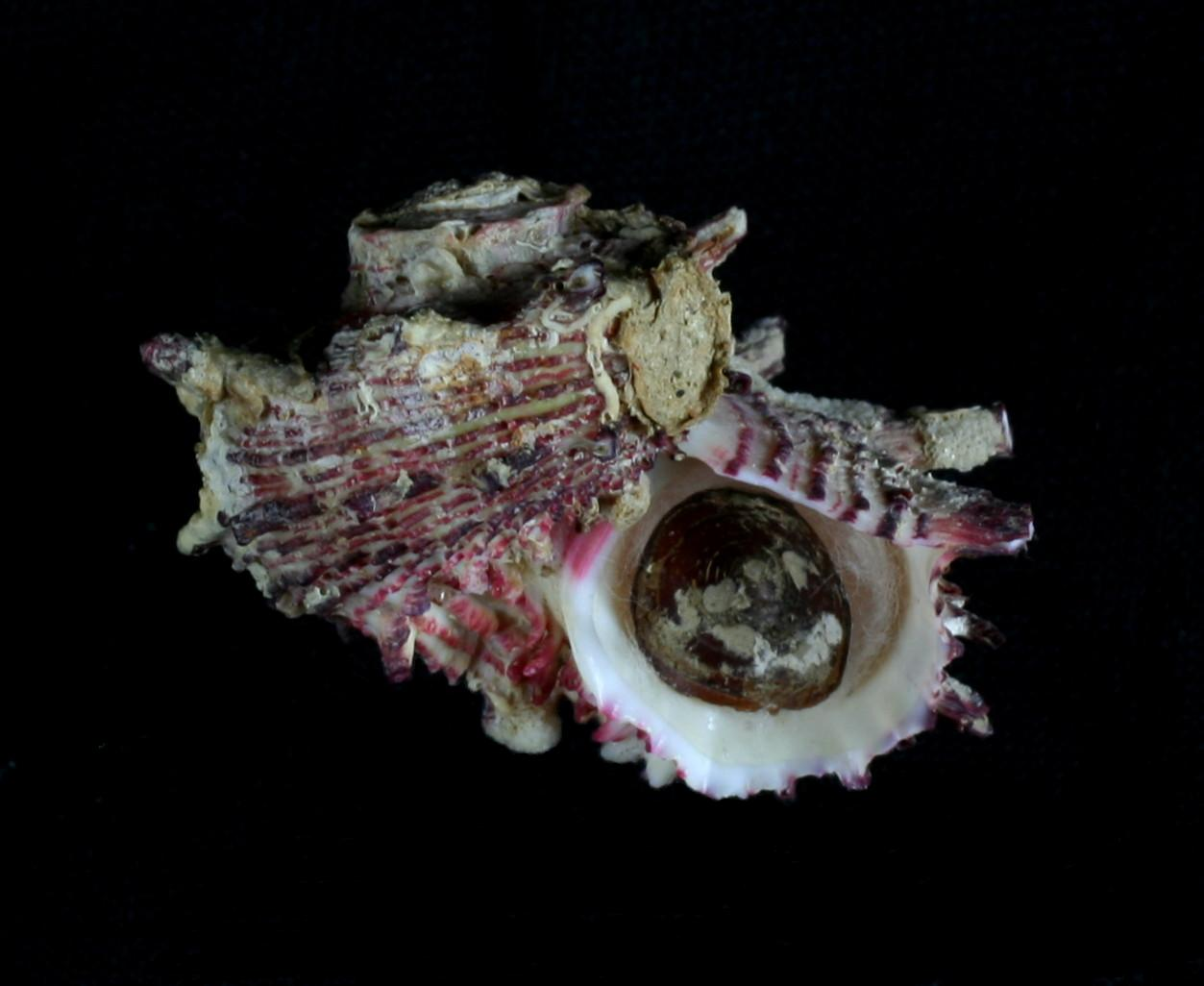
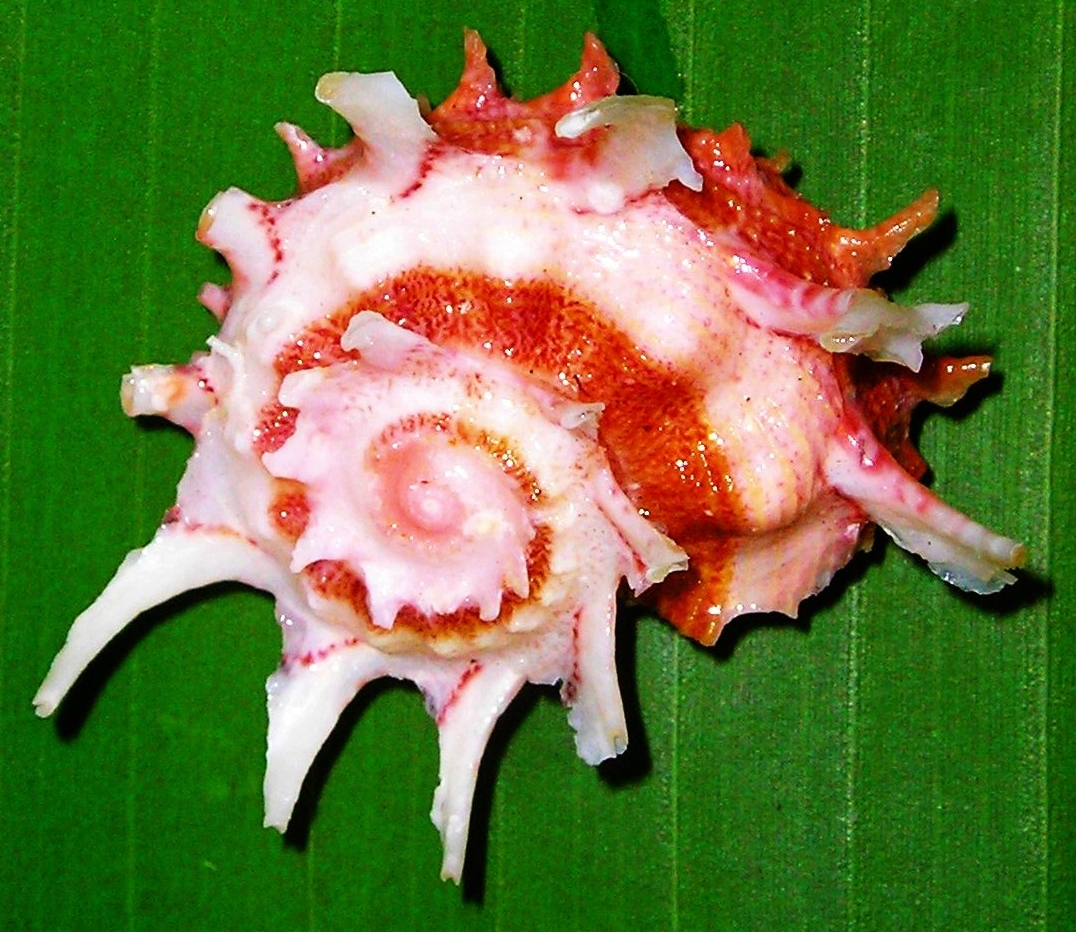
- Angaria delphinus f. martinii (A. Adams, 1854); Angaria laciniata (Lamarck, 1816); Angarina delphinus; Angarina delphinus f. incisa (Reeve, 1843); Delphinula atrata Reeve, 1843; Delphinula coronata A. Adams, 1850; Delphinula delphinus (Linnaeus, 1758); Delphinula euracantha A. Adams, 1850; Delphinula incisa Reeve, 1842; Delphinula laciniata Lamarck, 1816; Delphinula martinii A. Adams, 1854; Turbo delphinus Linnaeus, 1758 (basionym); Turbo distortus Linnaeus, 1758; Shell of Angaria delphinus form atrata with operculum taken by gill net in 5 to 10 fathoms off Minabe, in Japan. Apical view of another color form of Angaria delphinus showing variability of the species.

= Angaria delphinus =

Species of gastropod

Angaria delphinus, common name the common delphinula, is a species of sea snail, a marine gastropod mollusc of the family Angariidae.

== Description ==
The shell of this species is variable in degree of sculpture, depending on how exposed or sheltered the environment is in which the snail lives. These different forms are called ecomorphs.

The shells can reach 73 mm in size. The interior of the shells are lined with mother of pearl, whereas the exterior of the shells are often decorated with stumpy outgrowths that resemble hands or fingers. The spire of the shell is flattened, and the whorls may be distinctly angular in outline when viewed from above. There is a deep umbilicus, and when alive, the snail exhibits a brown horny operculum.

== Distribution ==
This species is found in shallow intertidal waters, usually on rocky shorelines and in reef flats. It is native to the Central Indo-Pacific, from Northern Australia and New Caledonia to Japan, Southeast Asia, and the Andaman Sea.
