= Tangle net =

Type of nylon fishing net

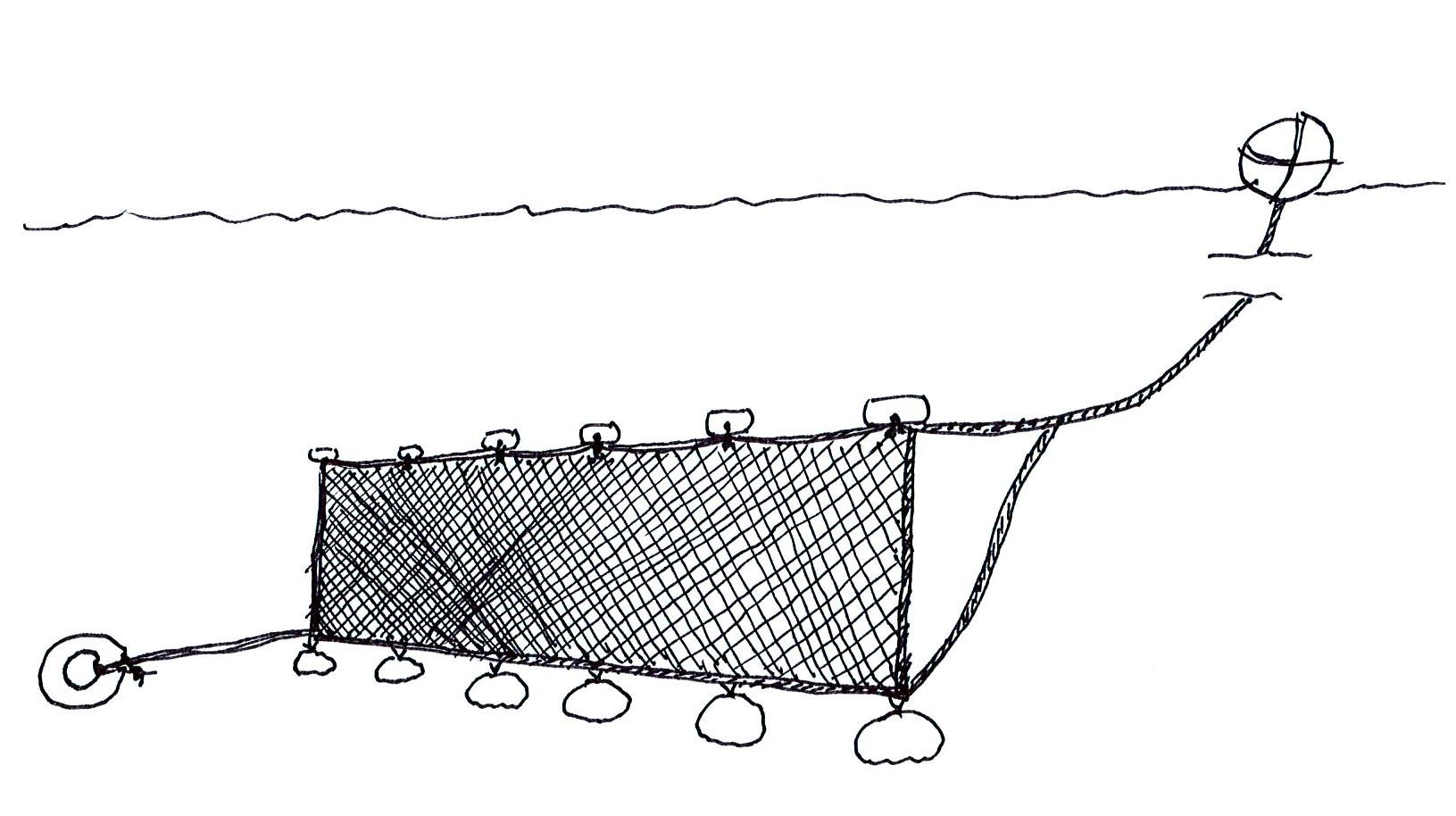
Diagram of a tangle net shown upright for viewing. When used by fishermen in the Philippines it is positioned on the sea bottom against a near-vertical underwater cliff wall (drop-off zone).

The tangle net, or tooth net, is a type of nylon fishing net similar to a gillnet. Left in the water for no more than two days, and allowing bycatch to be released alive, this net is considered to be less harmful than other nets. The tangle net is used in the Philippines by commercial fishermen, as well as by the scientific community. When spent, these nets can be bundled, and left on the sea floor to collect smaller species. These bundles are known locally as lumen lumen nets.

== Description and technique ==
The tangle net originated in British Columbia, Canada, as a gear specifically developed for selective fisheries. Tangle nets have smaller mesh sizes than standard gillnets. They are designed to catch fish by their nose or jaw, enabling bycatch to be resuscitated and released unharmed. These nets are made with a very thin light nylon rope, have a small mesh and are strung between two ropes, a top rope with floats, and a bottom rope with weights. Dropped to the bottom of the ocean, located and retrieved through the use of a guide line and buoy, these nets have allowed both fishermen and scientists to reach areas not previously accessible. Tangle nets are generally left on the bottom for no more than a day or two so that the fish and bycatch does not die and spoil.

== Use in the Philippines ==
For the last two decades tangle nets have been set in deep water near steep underwater cliffs off many islands in the Philippines by local fishermen in order to supplement their income through catching commercially valuable mollusks. Scientists have used this technique in recent years to explore the deep water marine habitat. The rich species diversity of the Philippine Islands has been explored through the use of tangle nets which are able to obtain specimens from areas not reachable by traditional methods of using trawls and dredges. Through the placement of tangle nets 50 to 100 meters long, at depths from 100 meters to 400 meters, this cryptic marine habitat has been explored and many new and/or rare species of gastropods and crustaceans have been acquired. The success of deep set tangle nets was further exploited when Philippe Bouchet and Danilo Largo launched an expedition in 2004 to explore the Panglao area, known as the 2004 Panglao Marine Biodiversity Project.

== Lumen lumen nets ==
When tangle nets are damaged beyond repair they are twisted and wrapped into long bundles, which the Philippine locals call lumen lumen nets. These long, sausage-like bundles are placed on the sea bottom along drop-offs in deep water with strong currents and left for several months at a time, which allows time for veligers to settle and larvae to grow. Lumen lumen nets have yielded many more species of marine animals, including many very small species of micromollusks.

== See also ==
- Drift net
- Cast net
- Seine fishing
