= Coralliophila kaofitorum =

Scientific classification
- Kingdom: Animalia
- Phylum: Mollusca
- Class: Gastropoda
- Subclass: Caenogastropoda
- Order: Neogastropoda
- Family: Muricidae
- Genus: Coralliophila
- Species: C. kaofitorum

Binomial name
- Coralliophila kaofitorum Vega, Vega & Luque, 2002

Species of gastropod

Coralliophila kaofitorum is a species of sea snail, a marine gastropod mollusk in the family Muricidae, the murex snails or rock snails.
