= Coralliophila nanhaiensis =

Scientific classification
- Kingdom: Animalia
- Phylum: Mollusca
- Class: Gastropoda
- Subclass: Caenogastropoda
- Order: Neogastropoda
- Family: Muricidae
- Genus: Coralliophila
- Species: C. nanhaiensis

Binomial name
- Coralliophila nanhaiensis Zhang & Wei, 2005

Species of gastropod

Coralliophila nanhaiensis is a species of sea snail, a marine gastropod mollusk in the family Muricidae, the murex snails or rock snails.
