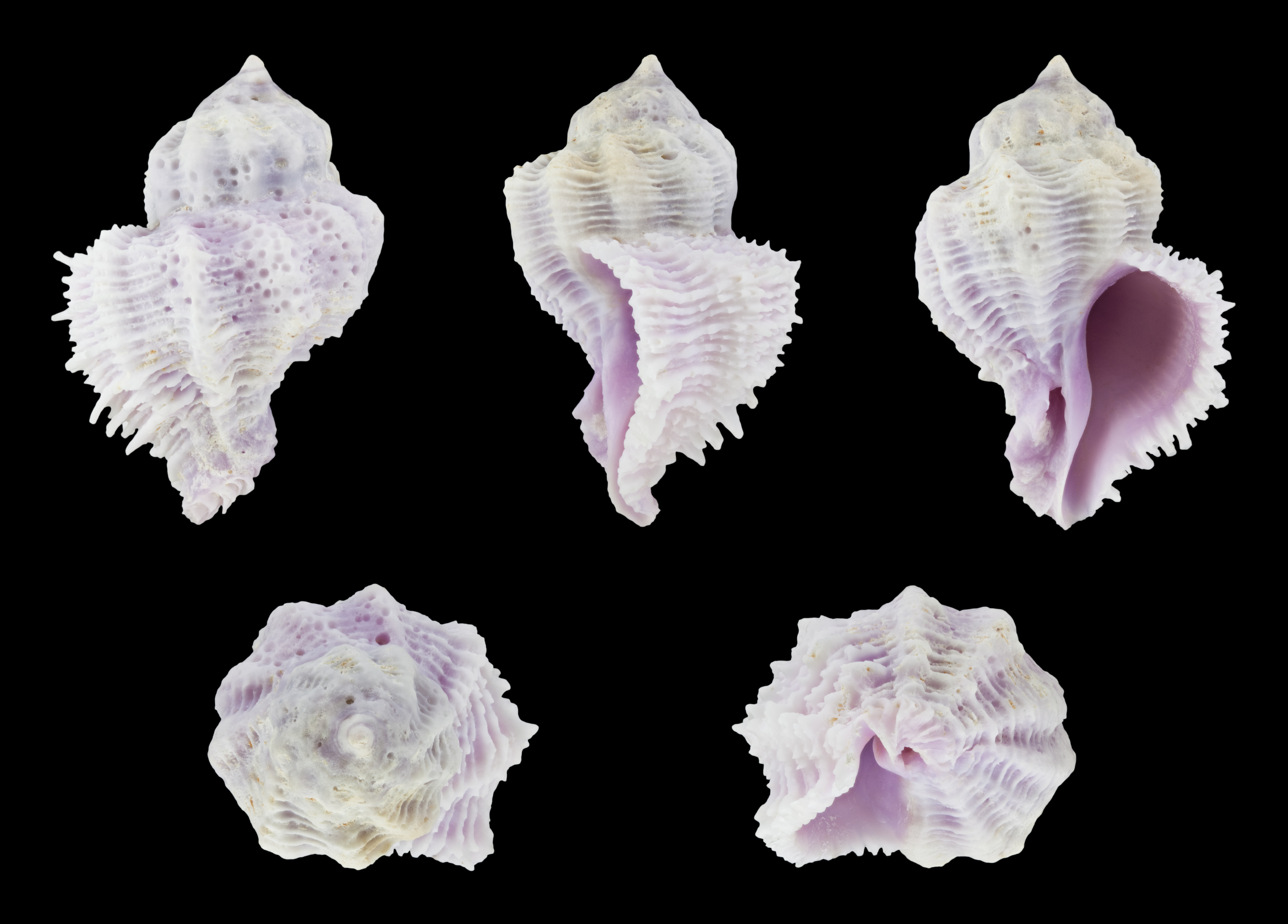

Scientific classification
- Kingdom: Animalia
- Phylum: Mollusca
- Class: Gastropoda
- Subclass: Caenogastropoda
- Order: Neogastropoda
- Superfamily: Muricoidea
- Family: Muricidae
- Subfamily: Coralliophilinae
- Genus: Coralliophila
- Species: C. bulbiformis

Binomial name
- Coralliophila bulbiformis (Conrad, 1837)

Synonyms
- Coralliophila cantrainei (Montrouzier, 1861); Purpura bulbiformis Conrad, 1837; Purpura cantrainei Montrouzier, 1861; Purpura gibbosa Reeve, 1846

= Coralliophila bulbiformis =

Species of gastropod

Coralliophila bulbiformis is a species of sea snail, a marine gastropod mollusk, in the family Muricidae, the murex snails or rock snails.

== Description ==
Shell size 25 mm.

== Distribution ==
This species occurs in New Zealand Exclusive Economic Zone, Philippines and off New Caledonia.
