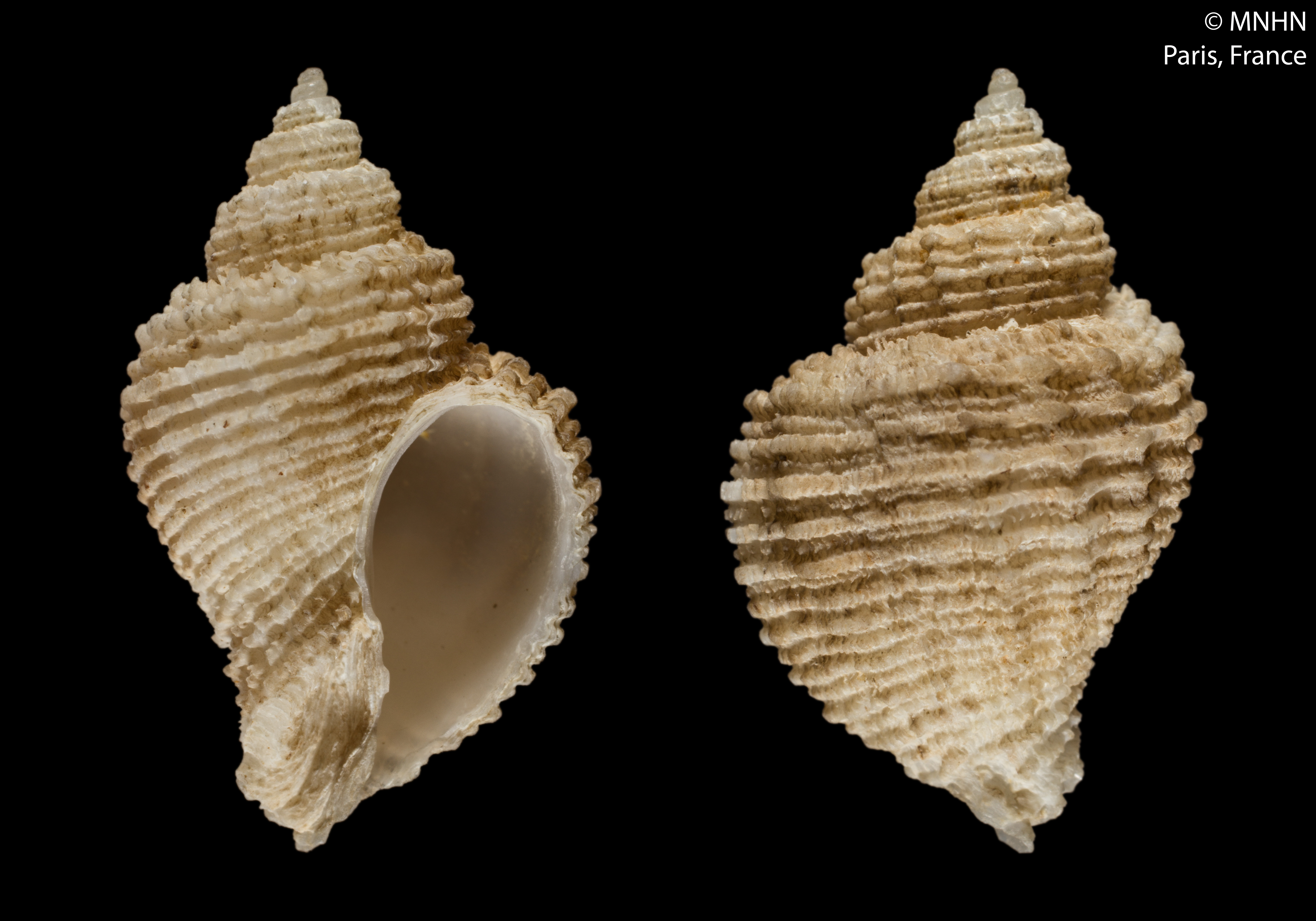
- Shell of Coralliophila cancellarioidea (holotype at MNHN, Paris)

Scientific classification
- Kingdom: Animalia
- Phylum: Mollusca
- Class: Gastropoda
- Subclass: Caenogastropoda
- Order: Neogastropoda
- Family: Muricidae
- Genus: Coralliophila
- Species: C. cancellarioidea

Binomial name
- Coralliophila cancellarioidea Oliverio, 2008

= Coralliophila cancellarioidea =

Species of gastropod

Coralliophila cancellarioidea is a species of sea snail, a marine gastropod mollusc in the family Muricidae, the murex snails or rock snails.

== Description ==
The length of the shell attains 21.5 mm with a tannish brown color.

== Distribution ==
This marine species occurs off New Caledonia.
