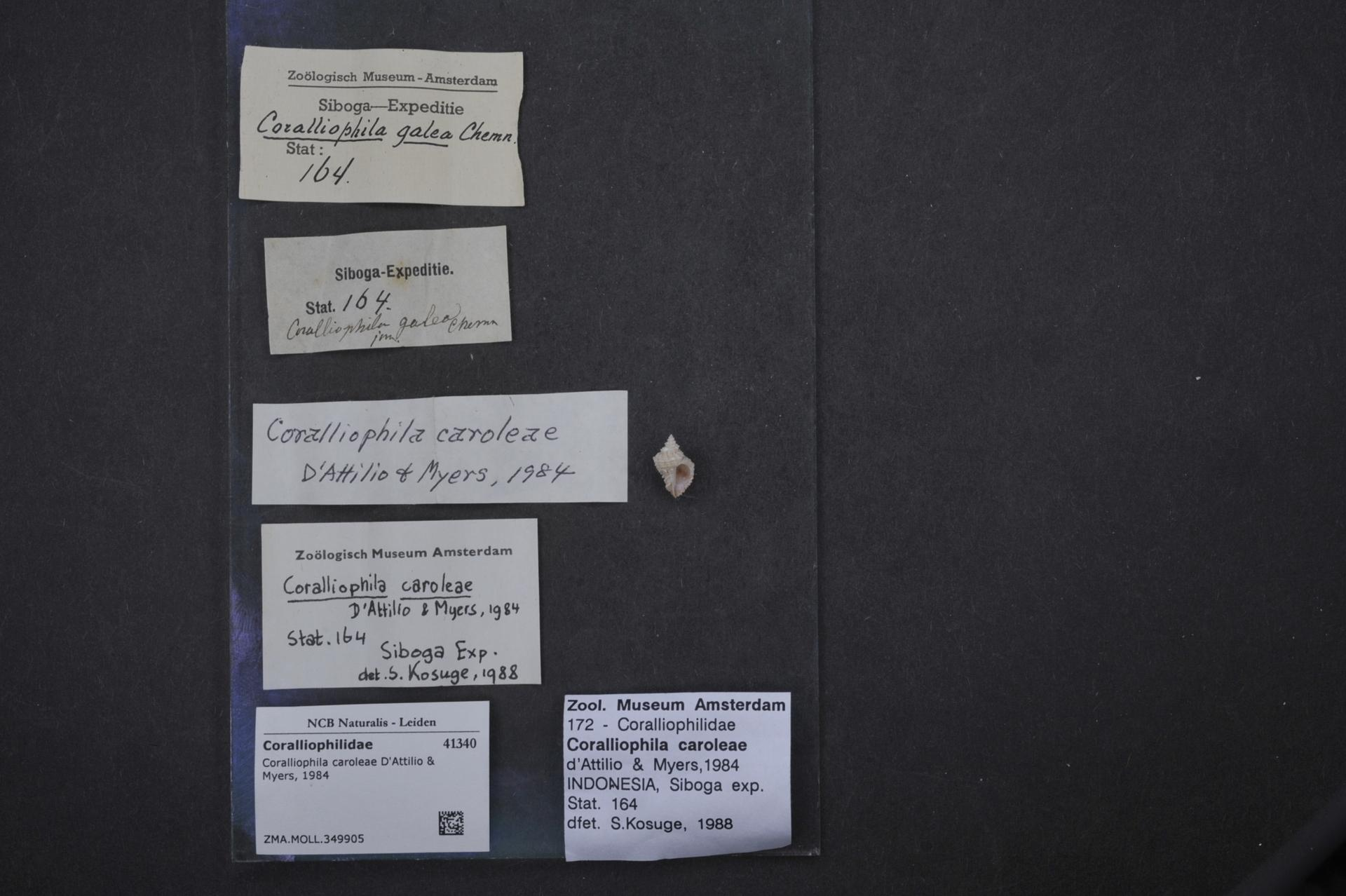
- Coralliophila caroleae

Scientific classification
- Kingdom: Animalia
- Phylum: Mollusca
- Class: Gastropoda
- Subclass: Caenogastropoda
- Order: Neogastropoda
- Family: Muricidae
- Genus: Coralliophila
- Species: C. caroleae

Binomial name
- Coralliophila caroleae D'Attilio & Myers, 1984

= Coralliophila caroleae =

Species of gastropod

Coralliophila caroleae is a species of sea snail, a marine gastropod mollusk, in the family Muricidae, the murex snails or rock snails.
