= Coralliophila jarli =

Scientific classification
- Kingdom: Animalia
- Phylum: Mollusca
- Class: Gastropoda
- Subclass: Caenogastropoda
- Order: Neogastropoda
- Family: Muricidae
- Genus: Coralliophila
- Species: C. jarli

Binomial name
- Coralliophila jarli Knudsen, 1956

Species of gastropod

Coralliophila jarli is a species of sea snail, a marine gastropod mollusk in the family Muricidae, the murex snails or rock snails.
