= Coralliophila trigoi =

Scientific classification
- Kingdom: Animalia
- Phylum: Mollusca
- Class: Gastropoda
- Subclass: Caenogastropoda
- Order: Neogastropoda
- Family: Muricidae
- Genus: Coralliophila
- Species: C. trigoi

Binomial name
- Coralliophila trigoi Mariottini, Smriglio & Rolán 2005

Species of gastropod

Coralliophila trigoi is a species of sea snail, a marine gastropod mollusk in the family Muricidae, the murex snails or rock snails.
