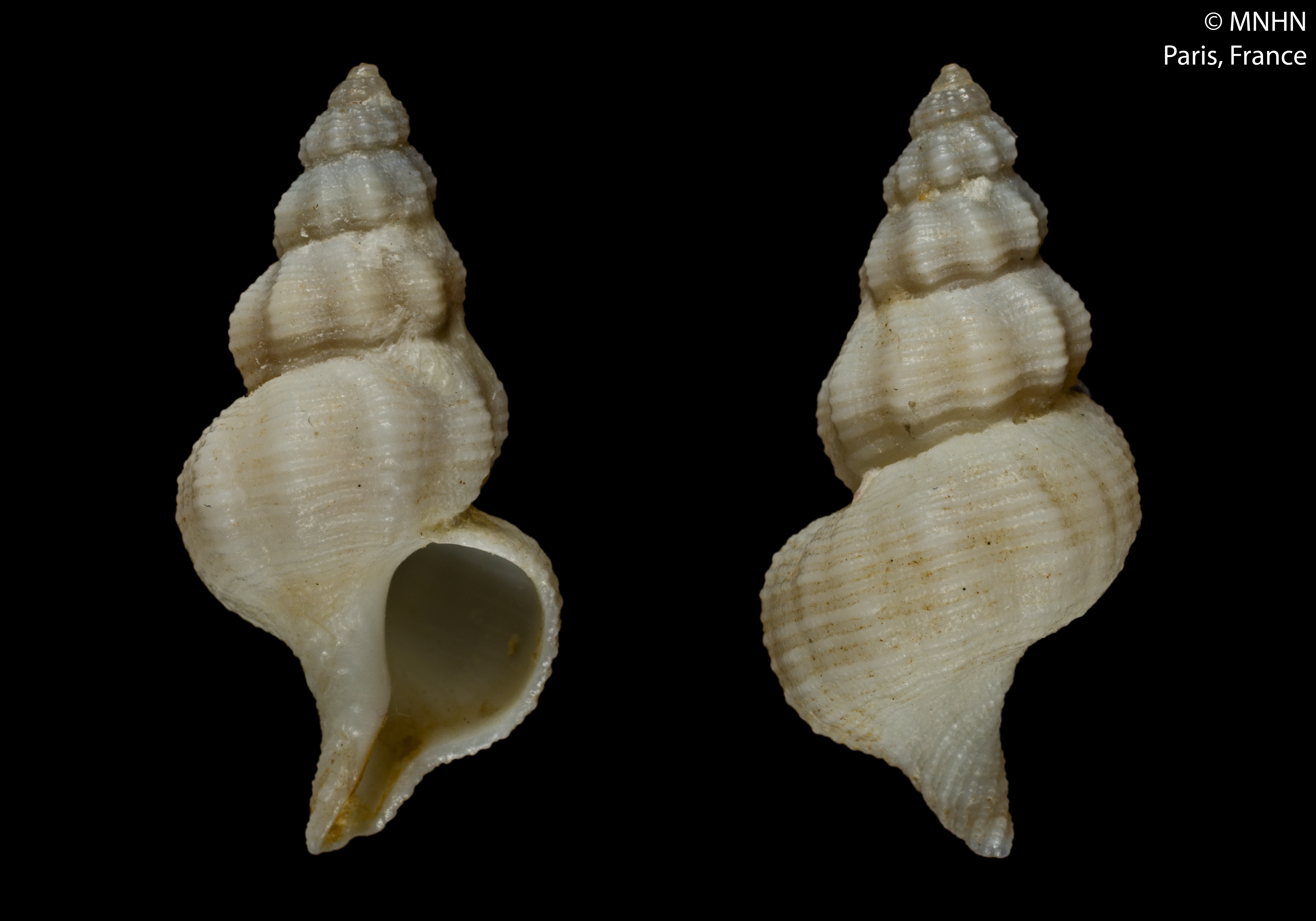
- Shell of Coralliophila rashafunensis (holotype at MNHN, Paris)

Scientific classification
- Kingdom: Animalia
- Phylum: Mollusca
- Class: Gastropoda
- Subclass: Caenogastropoda
- Order: Neogastropoda
- Superfamily: Muricoidea
- Family: Muricidae
- Subfamily: Coralliophilinae
- Genus: Coralliophila
- Species: C. rashafunensis

Binomial name
- Coralliophila rashafunensis Bozzetti, 2018

= Coralliophila rashafunensis =

Species of gastropod

Coralliophila rashafunensis is a species of sea snail, a marine gastropod mollusk, in the family Muricidae, the murex snails or rock snails.

== Description ==
The length of the shell attains 22 mm.

== Distribution ==
This species occurs in the Indian Ocean off Somalia.
