= Coralliophila erythrostoma =

Scientific classification
- Kingdom: Animalia
- Phylum: Mollusca
- Class: Gastropoda
- Subclass: Caenogastropoda
- Order: Neogastropoda
- Family: Muricidae
- Genus: Coralliophila
- Species: C. erythrostoma

Binomial name
- Coralliophila erythrostoma E. A. Smith, 1890

Species of gastropod

Coralliophila erythrostoma is a species of sea snail, a marine gastropod mollusk, in the family Muricidae, the murex snails or rock snails.
