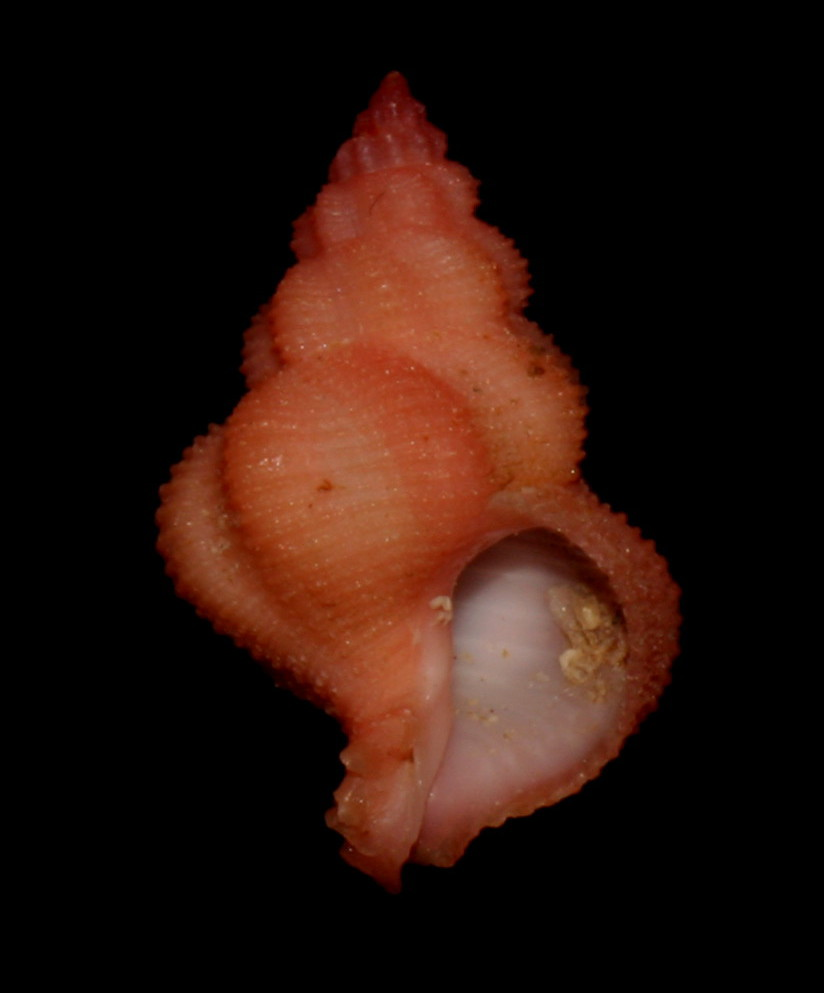
- Shell of Coralliophila abnormis (E.A. Smith, 1878), 16.2 mm in length, trawled at 150 m off Aliguay Island, Philippines.

Scientific classification
- Kingdom: Animalia
- Phylum: Mollusca
- Class: Gastropoda
- Subclass: Caenogastropoda
- Order: Neogastropoda
- Family: Muricidae
- Genus: Coralliophila
- Species: C. abnormis

Binomial name
- Coralliophila abnormis (E.A. Smith, 1878)

= Coralliophila abnormis =

Species of gastropod

Coralliophila abnormis is a species of sea snail, a marine gastropod mollusk in the family Muricidae, the murex snails or rock snails.
