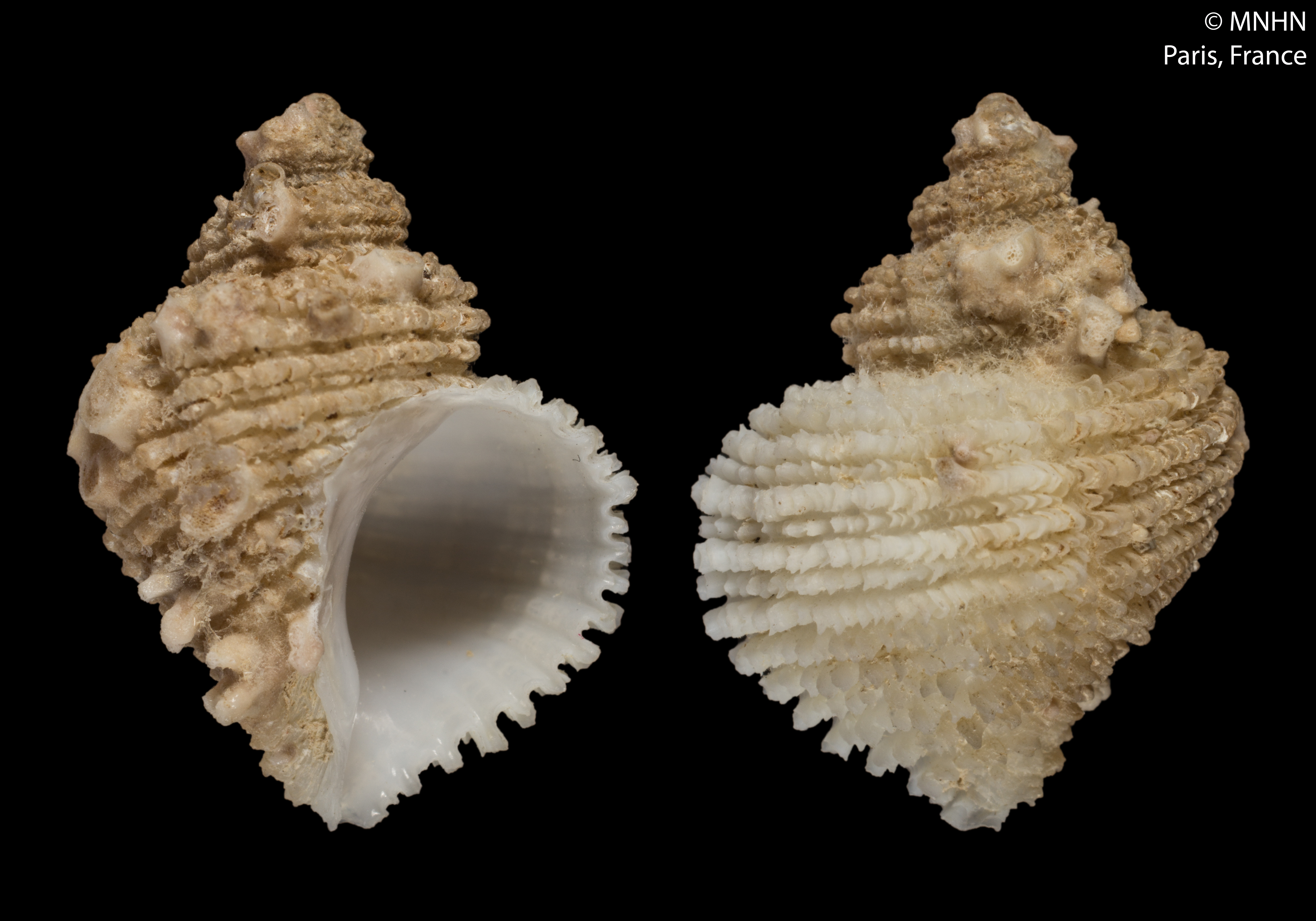
- Shell of Coralliophila rhomboidea (holotype at MNHN, Paris)

Scientific classification
- Kingdom: Animalia
- Phylum: Mollusca
- Class: Gastropoda
- Subclass: Caenogastropoda
- Order: Neogastropoda
- Family: Muricidae
- Genus: Coralliophila
- Species: C. rhomboidea

Binomial name
- Coralliophila rhomboidea Kosuge & Oliverio, 2004

= Coralliophila rhomboidea =

Species of gastropod

Coralliophila rhomboidea is a species of sea snail, a marine gastropod mollusk in the family Muricidae, the murex snails or rock snails.

== Description ==
(Original description) The shell is of medium size for the genus, measuring 19.9 mm in height and 14.8 mm in width in the holotype. It is solid and rhomboidal in outline. The protoconch is eroded and partially missing in the two available specimens, preventing a detailed assessment of its original features.

The teleoconch consists of five whorls in the holotype. The spire is relatively high and conical, with convex sides that become slightly constricted at the deeply incised suture. The body whorl is inflated and accounts for more than two-thirds of the total shell height. It is gently angulated at the shoulder before descending into nearly straight basal sides.

The aperture is large and oval. The outer lip is thin and simple, with a finely crenulated margin and numerous internal lirae. The inner lip is gently curved and coated with a callus. The siphonal canal is short and broadly open. The umbilical region is narrow, bearing a low, slender fasciole, while the umbilical chink remains narrow and only slightly open.

The sculpture of the teleoconch is dominated by closely spaced, broad spiral cords ornamented with minute, densely packed imbricate scales that impart a finely textured appearance. The body whorl bears twelve primary spiral cords together with five secondary cords, while six cords are visible on the penultimate whorl.

The shell is uniformly ivory white, and the interior of the aperture is a striking bright white. The operculum is chestnut brown, oval in shape, and characterized by a latero-terminal nucleus.

== Distribution ==
This marine species occurs off New Caledonia.
