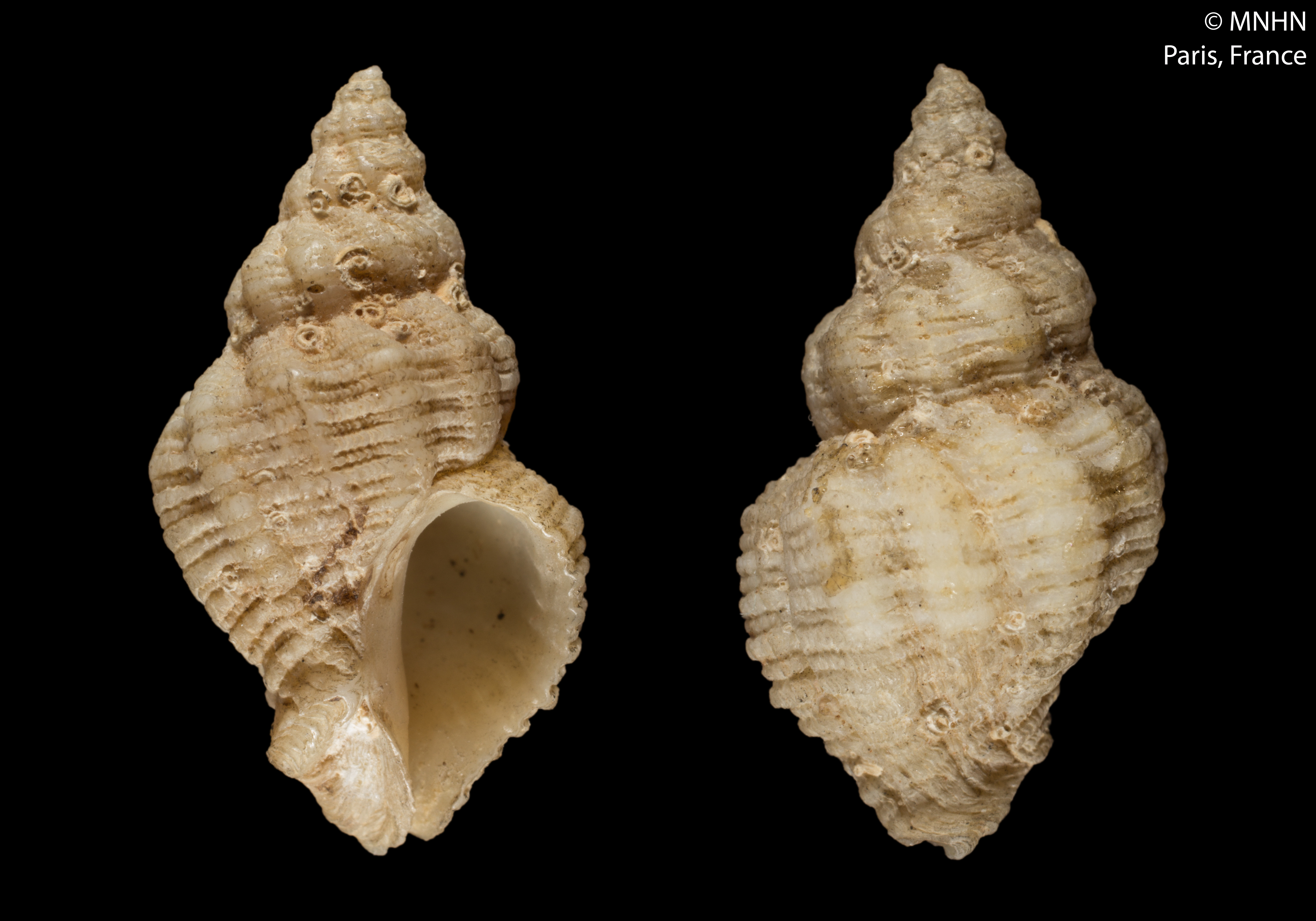
- Shell of Coralliophila giton (syntype at MNHN, Paris)

Scientific classification
- Kingdom: Animalia
- Phylum: Mollusca
- Class: Gastropoda
- Subclass: Caenogastropoda
- Order: Neogastropoda
- Family: Muricidae
- Genus: Coralliophila
- Species: C. giton

Binomial name
- Coralliophila giton (Dautzenberg, 1891)

Synonyms
- Purpura giton Dautzenberg, 1891

= Coralliophila giton =

Species of gastropod

Coralliophila giton is a species of sea snail, a marine gastropod mollusk in the family Muricidae, the murex snails or rock snails.

== Distribution ==
This marine species occurs off Senegal.
