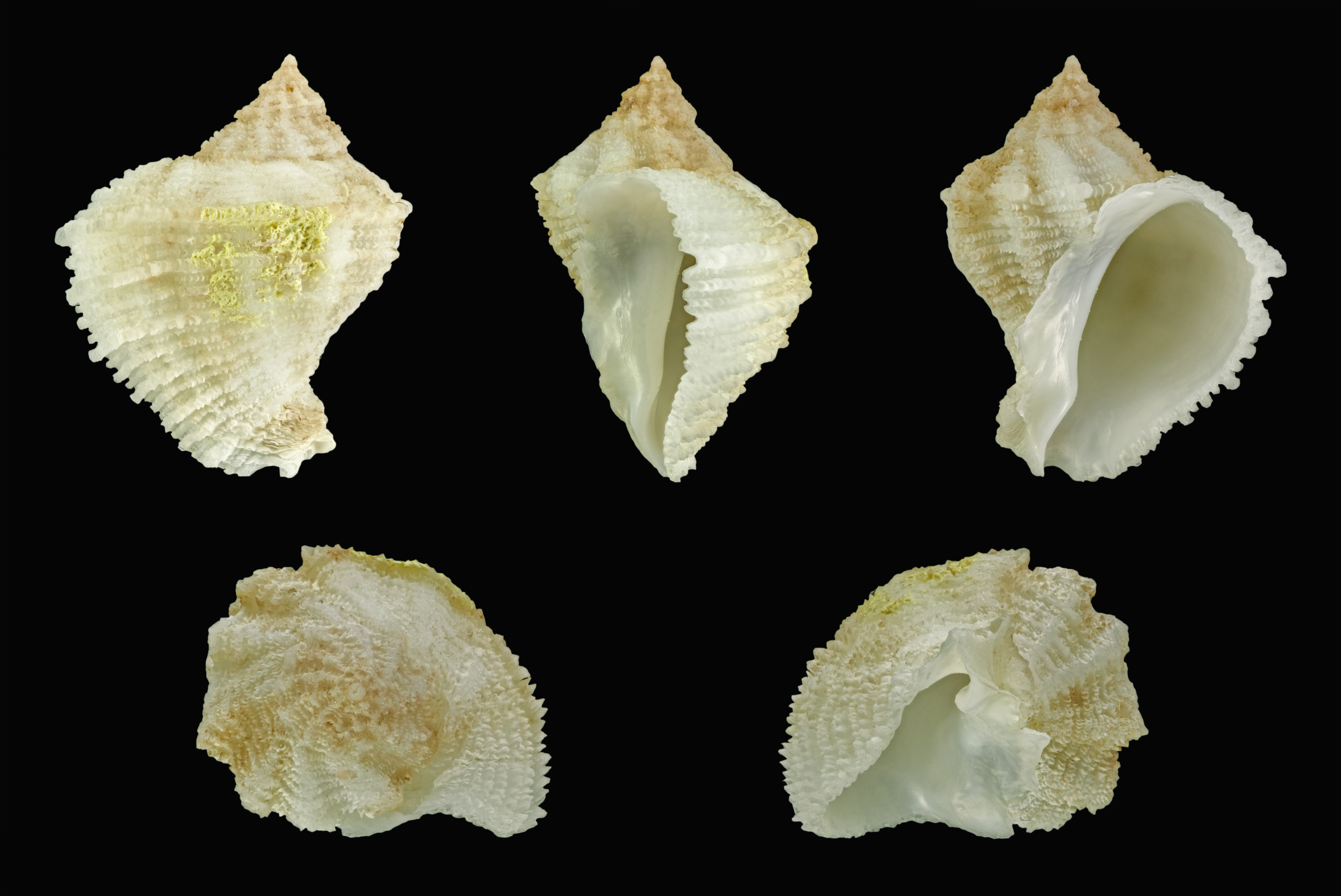

Scientific classification
- Kingdom: Animalia
- Phylum: Mollusca
- Class: Gastropoda
- Subclass: Caenogastropoda
- Order: Neogastropoda
- Family: Muricidae
- Genus: Coralliophila
- Species: C. brevis

Binomial name
- Coralliophila brevis (Blainville, 1832)

Synonyms
- Purpura brevis Blainville, 1832; Pyrula squamulata Philippi, 1836; Pyrula santangeli Maravigna, 1840; Pyrula borbonica Maravigna, 1842; Coralliophila alboranensis Smriglio & Mariottini, 2003

= Coralliophila brevis =

Species of gastropod

Coralliophila brevis is a species of sea snail, a marine gastropod mollusk in the family Muricidae, the murex snails or rock snails.
