= Coralliophila parvula =

Scientific classification
- Kingdom: Animalia
- Phylum: Mollusca
- Class: Gastropoda
- Subclass: Caenogastropoda
- Order: Neogastropoda
- Family: Muricidae
- Genus: Coralliophila
- Species: C. parvula

Binomial name
- Coralliophila parvula Bozzetti, 2007

Species of sea snail

Coralliophila parvula is a species of sea snail, a marine gastropod mollusc in the family Muricidae, commonly known as murex snails or rock snails.

== Description ==
The shell of Coralliophila parvula is small, reaching a length of approximately 5.75 mm. It is elongated with a conical spire and smooth to slightly sculptured surface. The aperture is narrow, and the outer lip is thin, reflecting typical characteristics of the genus Coralliophila. The coloration is generally pale, varying from off-white to light beige.

== Distribution ==
This species occurs in the western Indian Ocean, specifically off the coast of Madagascar.

== Habitat and ecology ==
Coralliophila parvula is a marine species typically found associated with coral reef environments. Like other members of the genus, it is presumed to feed on sessile invertebrates, including coral polyps. It inhabits shallow to moderately deep waters, although precise depth ranges have not been fully documented.

== Taxonomy ==
Coralliophila parvula was described by Bozzetti in 2007 based on specimens collected off Madagascar. The holotype is housed at the Muséum national d’Histoire naturelle (MNHN) in Paris. The species is a member of the genus Coralliophila, which includes several coral-associated gastropods in the family Muricidae.
