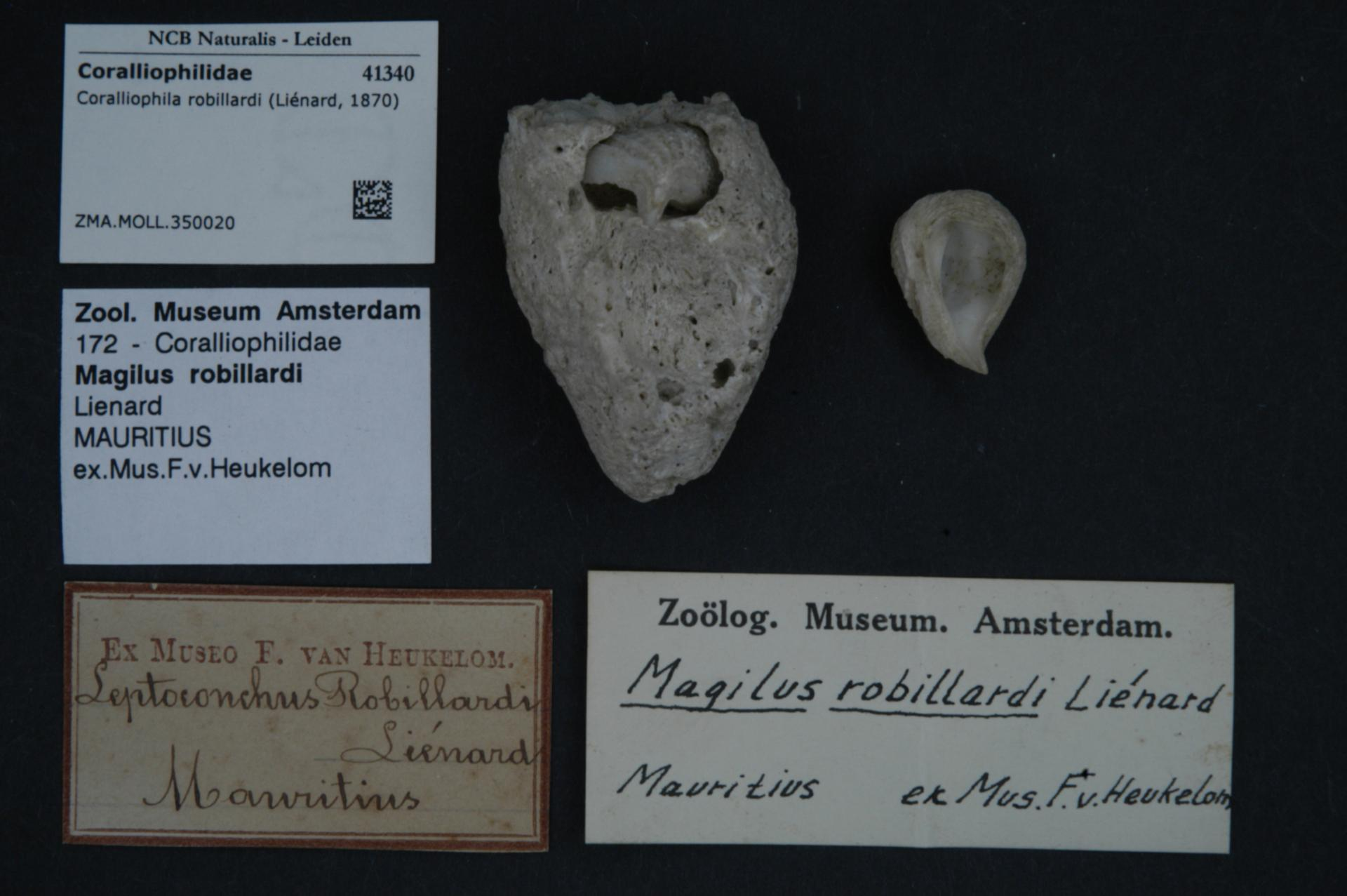
- Shell of Coralliophila robillardi (specimen at Naturalis Biodiversity Center)

Scientific classification
- Kingdom: Animalia
- Phylum: Mollusca
- Class: Gastropoda
- Subclass: Caenogastropoda
- Order: Neogastropoda
- Superfamily: Muricoidea
- Family: Muricidae
- Subfamily: Coralliophilinae
- Genus: Coralliophila
- Species: C. robillardi

Binomial name
- Coralliophila robillardi (Liénard, 1870)

Synonyms
- Coralliobia robillardi (Liénard, 1870); Leptoconchus robillardi Liénard, 1870; Magilus robillardi Liénard, 1870

= Coralliophila robillardi =

Species of gastropod

Coralliophila robillardi is a species of sea snail, a marine gastropod mollusk, in the family Muricidae, the murex snails or rock snails.

== Distribution ==
This species occurs in the Indian Ocean off Mauritius.
