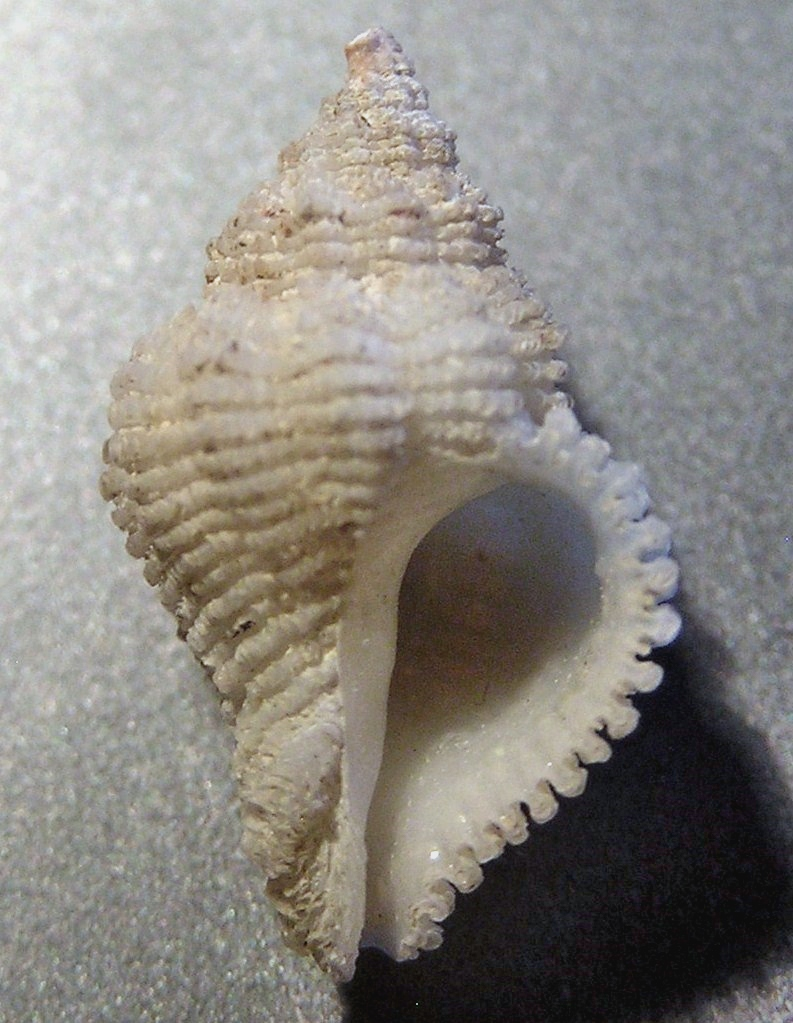
- Apertural view of a shell of Coralliophila inflata

Scientific classification
- Kingdom: Animalia
- Phylum: Mollusca
- Class: Gastropoda
- Subclass: Caenogastropoda
- Order: Neogastropoda
- Superfamily: Muricoidea
- Family: Muricidae
- Subfamily: Coralliophilinae
- Genus: Coralliophila; H. Adams & A. Adams, 1853

Type species
- Murex neritoideus Gmelin, 1791

Synonyms
- Aradasia Settepassi, 1970 (Invalid: junior homonym of Aradasia Gray, 1850 [Trochidae]); Aradomurex Coen, 1947 (Not available: no description); Concholepas (Coralliobia) H. Adams & A. Adams, 1853; Coralliobia H. Adams & A. Adams, 1853; Coralliophila (Coralliophila) H. Adams & A. Adams, 1853 · accepted, alternate representation; Coralliophila (Latimurex) Coen, 1922 · accepted, alternate representation; Coralliophila (Pseudomurex) Monterosato, 1872 · accepted, alternate representation; Coralliophila (Rhombothais) Woolacott, 1954 · accepted, alternate representation; Fusomurex Coen, 1922; Galeropsis Hupé, 1860; Latimurex (misspelling); Latiromurex Coen, 1922; Lepadomurex Coen, 1922; Murex (Pseudomurex); Pseudomurex Monterosato, 1872; Pseudomurex (Fusomurex) Coen, 1922; Pseudomurex (Latiromurex) Coen, 1922; Pseudomurex (Lepadomurex) Coen, 1922; Quoyula Iredale, 1912; Reliquiaecava Massin, 1987; Rhizochilus (Coralliophila) H. Adams & A. Adams, 1853 (original rank); Rhombothais Woolacott, 1954

= Coralliophila =

Genus of gastropods

Coralliophila is a genus of sea snails, marine gastropod mollusks in the subfamily Coralliophilinae, the coral snails, within the family Muricidae, the murex snails and rock snails.

The genus Coralliophila is most probably polyphyletic and should be restricted to the species most closely related to the type species. Species in the genus Hirtomurex, situated in the Indo-West Pacific are not clearly distinguishable from the species in the genus Coralliophila sensu lato (in the broad sense) found in the Eastern Atlantic.

== Description ==
The outer and inner lips of the shell are irregular. They are moderate, not produced into an extended process closing the aperture.

== Species ==
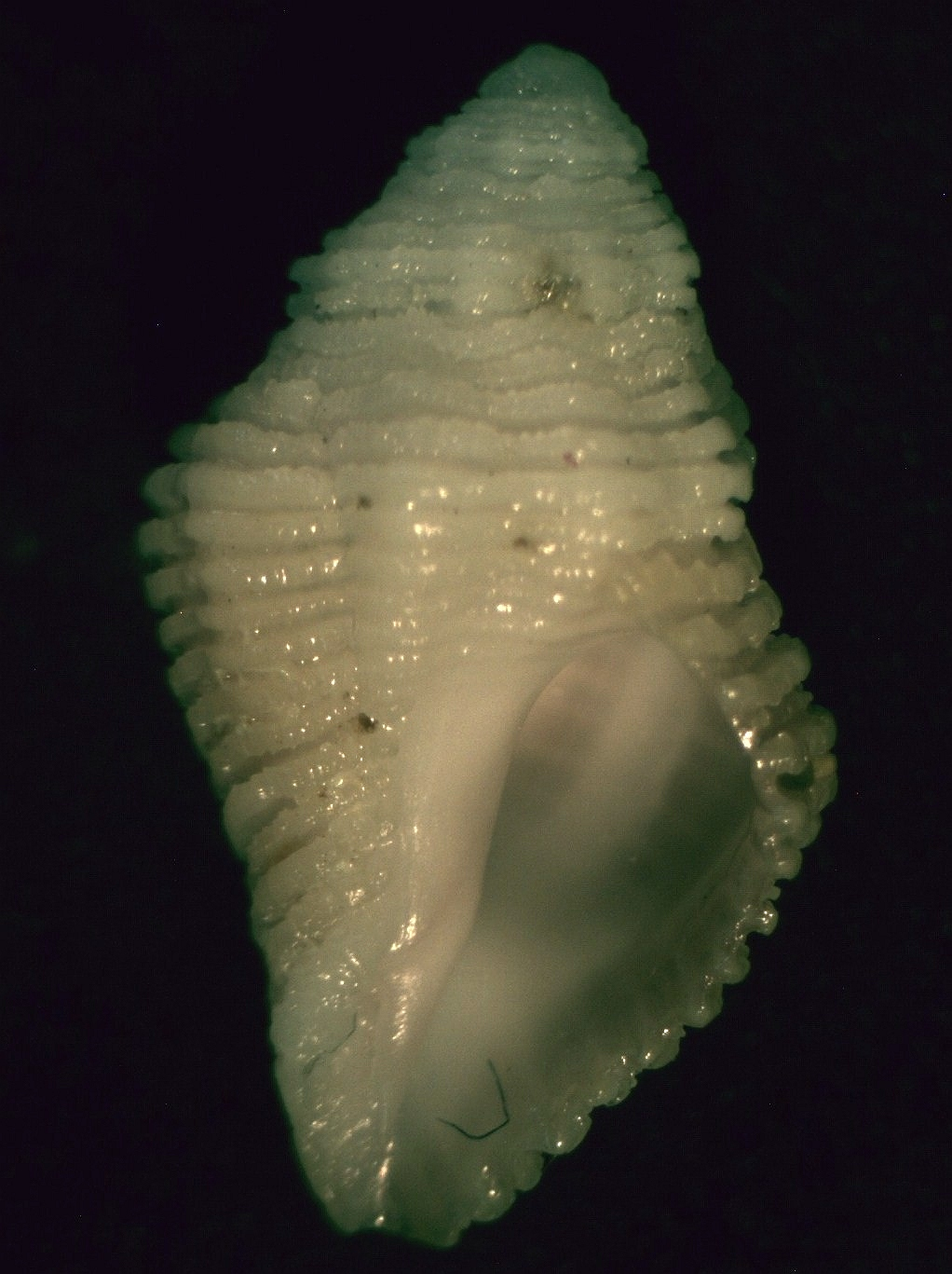
Apertural view of a shell of Coralliophila mira

Species within the genus Coralliophila s.l. include:

- Coralliophila aberrans (C. B. Adams, 1850)
- Coralliophila abnormis (E.A. Smith, 1878)
- Coralliophila adansoni Kosuge & Fernandes, 1989
- Coralliophila aedonia (Watson, 1885)
- Coralliophila africana Smriglio & Mariottini, 2001
- Coralliophila ahuiri Cossignani, 2009
- Coralliophila alboangulata (E. A. Smith, 1890)
- Coralliophila alexpoppei Poppe & Tagaro, 2026 (original description)
- Coralliophila amirantium E. A. Smith, 1884
- Coralliophila andamana Melvill, 1889
- † Coralliophila angsanana K. Martin, 1921
- Coralliophila atlantica E. A. Smith, 1890
- Coralliophila australis Oliverio, 2009
- Coralliophila basileus (Dautzenberg & Fischer H., 1896)
- Coralliophila bathus Oliverio, 2008
- † Coralliophila bayeri Ladd, 1977
- † Coralliophila bracteata (Brocchi, 1814)
- Coralliophila brevis (de Blainville, 1832)
- Coralliophila bulbiformis (Conrad, 1837)
- † Coralliophila burdigalensis (Tournouër, 1874)
- Coralliophila cancellarioidea Oliverio, 2008
- Coralliophila candidissima Oliverio, 2008
- Coralliophila caribaea Abbott, 1958
- Coralliophila carnosa Kosuge, 1986
- Coralliophila caroleae D'Attilio & Myers, 1984
- Coralliophila clathrata (A. Adams, 1854)
- Coralliophila confusa Kosuge, 1986
- Coralliophila costata (Blainville, 1832)
- Coralliophila costularis (Lamarck, 1816)
- Coralliophila cumingii (H. Adams & A. Adams, 1864)
- Coralliophila curacaoensis Potkamp & Hoeksema, 2017
- Coralliophila curta Sowerby III, 1894
- Coralliophila elaborata H. Adams & A. Adams, 1863
- Coralliophila elvirae D'Attilio & Emerson, 1980
- Coralliophila erosa (Röding, 1798)
- Coralliophila erythrostoma E. A. Smith, 1890
- Coralliophila fearnleyi (Emerson & D'Attilio, 1965)
- Coralliophila fimbriata (A. Adams, 1854)
- Coralliophila flava Kosuge, 1985
- Coralliophila fontanangioyae Smriglio & Mariottini, 2000
- Coralliophila fragosa E.A. Smith, 1910
- Coralliophila francoisi Bozzetti, 2006
- Coralliophila fritschi (Martens, 1874)
- Coralliophila galea (Dillwyn, 1823)
- Coralliophila giton (Dautzenberg, 1891)
- † Coralliophila gracilispira O. Boettger, 1906
- † Coralliophila granifera (Michelotti, 1847)
- Coralliophila guancha Smriglio, Mariottini & Engl, 2003
- Coralliophila hayesi Smriglio & Mariottini, 2001
- Coralliophila hotei Kosuge, 1985
- Coralliophila infantula Kosuge, 1985
- Coralliophila inflata (Dunker in Philippi, 1847)
- Coralliophila jarli Knudsen
- Coralliophila jeffreysi E. A. Smith, 1879
- Coralliophila juliamoralesae Smriglio, Mariottini & Engl, 2002
- Coralliophila kaikonoi Poppe & Tagaro, 2026
- † Coralliophila kaiparaensis (P. Marshall, 1918)
- Coralliophila kalafuti (Petuch, 1987)
- Coralliophila kaofitorum Vega, Vega & Luque, 2002
- Coralliophila knudseni Smriglio & Mariottini, 2000
- Coralliophila latilirata Rehder, 1985
- Coralliophila leucostoma Kosuge, 1986
- Coralliophila liltvedi Kosuge, 1986
- † Coralliophila lividorupis (Laws, 1935)
- Coralliophila luglii Smriglio & Mariottini, 2011
- Coralliophila macleani Shasky, 1970
- † Coralliophila macneili Ladd, 1977
- Coralliophila mallicki Ladd, 1976
- Coralliophila mandji P. A. Bernard, 1989
- Coralliophila marrati Knudsen
- Coralliophila meyendorffii (Calcara, 1845)
- Coralliophila mira (Cotton & Godfrey, 1932)
- Coralliophila mitraeforma Kosuge, 1985
- Coralliophila monodonta (Blainville, 1832)
- Coralliophila monterosatoi (Locard, 1897)
- Coralliophila nanhaiensis Zhang & Wei, 2005
- Coralliophila nivea (A. Adams, 1853)
- Coralliophila nodosa (A. Adams, 1854)
- Coralliophila norfolk Oliverio, 2008
- Coralliophila nukuhiva Oliverio, 2008
- Coralliophila nux (Reeve, 1846)
- Coralliophila orcuttiana Dall, 1919
- Coralliophila ovoidea (Kosuge, 1985)
- Coralliophila panormitana (Monterosato, 1869)
- Coralliophila parva (E. A. Smith, 1877)
- Coralliophila parvula Bozzetti, 2007
- Coralliophila patruelis (E. A. Smith, 1890)
- Coralliophila persica Melvill, 1897
- Coralliophila porphyroleuca (Crosse, 1870)
- † Coralliophila problematica K. Martin, 1899
- Coralliophila pulchella (A. Adams, 1854)
- Coralliophila radula (A. Adams, 1855)
- Coralliophila rashafunensis Bozzetti, 2018
- † Coralliophila renatimagnei Magne, 1941
- Coralliophila rhomboidea Kosuge & Oliverio, 2004
- Coralliophila richardi (Fischer P., 1882)
- Coralliophila robillardi (Liénard, 1870)
- Coralliophila roseocephala Kosuge, 1986
- Coralliophila rubrococcinea Melvill & Standen, 1901
- † Coralliophila sacyi (Cossmann & Peyrot, 1924)
- Coralliophila salebrosa H. Adams & A. Adams, 1863
- Coralliophila scala (A. Adams, 1854)
- Coralliophila scalaris (Brocchi, 1814)
- Coralliophila schioettei Smriglio & Mariottini, 2000
- † Coralliophila serraticincta Bałuk, 1995
- Coralliophila sertata (Hedley, 1903)
- † Coralliophila shimajiriensis MacNeil, 1961
- Coralliophila sofiae (Aradas & Benoit, 1876)
- † Coralliophila sokkohensis K. Martin, 1916
- Coralliophila solutistoma Kuroda & Shikama in Shikama, 1966
- Coralliophila squamosissima (Smith, 1876)
- Coralliophila squamulosa (Reeve, 1846 in 1843-65)
- Coralliophila suduirauti Smriglio & Mariottini, 2003
- Coralliophila tetragona Kosuge, 1986
- Coralliophila trigoi Mariottini, Smriglio & Rolán 2005
- † Coralliophila turneri Laws, 1941
- Coralliophila vertigo (Kosuge, 1986)
- Coralliophila violacea Kiener, 1836
- Coralliophila wilsoni Pritchard & Gatliff, 1898
- Coralliophila xenophila Oliverio, 2008

The Indo-Pacific Molluscan Database also recognizes the following species with names in current use :

- Coralliophila morishimai Kuroda & Shikama in Shikama, 1966
- Coralliophila ohmurai Kosuge, 1985
- Coralliophila tokioi Kosuge, 1985

Subgenus Coralliobia H. & A. Adams, 1853

- Coralliophila pterigostoma D'Attilio & Kosuge, 1988

Subgenus Coralliophila H. & A. Adams, 1853

- Coralliophila arabica Melvill, 1898
- Coralliophila porphyroleuca (Crosse, 1870)
- Coralliophila tetragona Kosuge, 1986

Subgenus Coralliofusus Kuroda, 1953

- Coralliophila acus (Kuroda, 1953)
- Coralliophila turrita Sowerby, 1888

Species brought into synonymy

- Coralliophila abbreviata auct. non Lamarck, 1816: synonym of Coralliophila galea (Dillwyn, 1823)
- Coralliophila abbreviata (Lamarck, 1816): synonym of Coralliophila erosa (Röding, 1798)
- Coralliophila acuti-tenuitas Settepassi, 1977: synonym of Coralliophila meyendorffii (Calcara, 1845)
- Coralliophila alboranensis Smriglio & Mariottini, 2003 : synonym of Coralliophila brevis (Blainville, 1832)
- Coralliophila alucoides (Blainville, 1829): synonym of Coralliophila squamosa (Bivona Ant. in Bivona And., 1838): synonym of Hirtomurex squamosus (Bivona Ant. in Bivona And., 1838)
- Coralliophila armeniaca D'Attilio & Myers, 1984: synonym of Coralliophila abnormis (E.A. Smith, 1878)
- Coralliophila asperrima H. Adams & A. Adams, 1863: synonym of Coralliophila scala (A. Adams, 1854)
- Coralliophila babelis (Requien, 1848): synonym of Babelomurex cariniferus (Sowerby, 1834)
- Coralliophila barclayana H. Adams, 1873: synonym of Pterymarchia barclayana (H. Adams, 1873)
- Coralliophila basilium Penna-Neme & Leme, 1978: synonym of Babelomurex dalli (Emerson & D'Attilio, 1963)
- Coralliophila cantrainei Montrouzier [in Souverbie], 1861: synonym of Coralliophila bulbiformis (Conrad, 1837)
- Coralliophila carinata Koroneos, 1979: synonym of Babelomurex cariniferus (Sowerby, 1834)
- Coralliophila confragosa H. & A. Adams, 1864: synonym of Muricodrupa fiscella (Gmelin, 1791)
- Coralliophila coronata H. Adams, 1869: synonym of Morula (Habromorula) coronata (H. Adams, 1869)
- Coralliophila crebrilamellosa (G.B. Sowerby III, 1913): synonym of Mipus crebrilamellosus (G. B. Sowerby III, 1913)
- Coralliophila deburghiae (Reeve, 1857) sensu Dall, 1889: synonym of Babelomurex dalli (Emerson & D'Attilio, 1963)
- Coralliophila deformis Lamarck: synonym of Coralliophila erosa (Röding, 1798)
- Coralliophila dissimulans Preston, 1904: synonym of Pascula ozenneana (Crosse, 1861)
- Coralliophila emimarumai Kosuge, 1981 accepted as Coralliophila persica Melvill, 1897
- Coralliophila fax F. M. Bayer, 1971: synonym of Babelomurex fax (F. M. Bayer, 1971)
- Coralliophila fontanangioyi Smriglio & Mariottini, 2000 : synonym of Coralliophila fontanangioyae Smriglio & Mariottini, 2000
- Coralliophila groschi Kilburn, 1977 : synonym of Coralliophila erosa (Röding, 1798)
- Coralliophila incompta Berry, 1960 : synonym of Attiliosa nodulosa (A. Adams, 1854)
- Coralliophila indica E.A. Smith, 1899 : synonym of Babelomurex indicus (E.A. Smith, 1899)
- Coralliophila isosceles Barnard, 1959 : synonym of Mipus isosceles (Barnard, 1959)
- Coralliophila isshikiensis Shikama, 1971: synonym of Hirtomurex isshikiensis (Shikama, 1971)
- Coralliophila kawamurai Shikama, 1978 : synonym of Hirtomurex kawamurai (Shikama, 1978)
- Coralliophila lacerata (Deshayes, 1856): synonym of Babelomurex cariniferus (Sowerby, 1834)
- Coralliophila lactuca Dall, 1889: synonym of Coralliophila richardi (P. Fischer, 1882)
- Coralliophila lamellosa (Philippi, 1836): synonym of Hirtomurex squamosus (Bivona Ant. in Bivona And., 1838)
- Coralliophila latiaxidea Sowerby, 1893 : synonym of Lataxiena fimbriata (Hinds, 1844)
- Coralliophila madreporarum (Sowerby, 1822): synonym of Coralliophila monodonta (Blainville, 1832)
- Coralliophila miyukiae Kosuge, 1985: synonym of Mipus miyukiae Kosuge, 1985
- Coralliophila neritoidea (Lamarck, 1816): synonym of Coralliophila violacea (Kiener, 1836)
- Coralliophila orbignyana (Petit de la Saussaye, 1851): synonym of Coralliophila erosa (Röding, 1798)
- Coralliophila pacei Petuch, 1987: synonym of Babelomurex pacei (Petuch, 1987) (unaccepted > superseded combination)
- Coralliophila patula Settepassi, 1977: synonym of Coralliophila brevis (Blainville, 1832)
- Coralliophila priolana Settepassi, 1971 : synonym of Babelomurex tectumsinensis (Deshayes, 1856)
- Coralliophila profundicola Haas, 1949: synonym of Coralliophila aedonia (Watson, 1886)
- Coralliophila pyriformis Kira, 1959 : synonym of Coralliophila radula (A. Adams, 1855)
- Coralliophila retusa H. Adams & A. Adams, 1863 : synonym of Coralliophila costularis (Lamarck, 1816)
- Coralliophila rolani Bogi & Nofroni, 1984 : synonym of Nucella rolani (Bogi & Nofroni, 1984)
- Coralliophila rosacea (E. A. Smith, 1903): synonym of Mipus rosaceus (E. A. Smith, 1903)
- Coralliophila scalariformis (Lamarck, 1822): synonym of Babelomurex scalariformis (Lamarck, 1822) (superseded combination)
- Coralliophila sentix Bayer, 1971: synonym of Babelomurex sentix (Bayer, 1971)
- Coralliophila spinosa Dall, 1925 : synonym of Babelomurex spinosus (Hirase, 1908)
- Coralliophila squamosa (Bivona Ant. in Bivona And., 1838): synonym of Hirtomurex squamosus (Bivona Ant. in Bivona And., 1838)
- Coralliophila stearnsiana Dall, 1919 : synonym of Coralliophila erosa (Röding, 1798)
- Coralliophila stearnsii Pilsbry, 1895 : synonym of Coralliophila squamosissima (E.A. Smith, 1876)
- Coralliophila suturalis A. Adams in H. Adams & A. Adams, 1853: synonym of Coralliophila erosa (Röding, 1798)
- Coralliophila tomlini van Regteren Altena, 1950 : synonym of Mipus tomlini (van Regteren Altena, 1950)
- Coralliophila turris Settepassi, 1977: synonym of Coralliophila squamosa (Bivona Ant. in Bivona And., 1838): synonym of Hirtomurex squamosus (Bivona Ant. in Bivona And., 1838)
- Coralliophila zuluensis Barnard, 1959: synonym of Coralliophila crebrilamellosa (G.B. Sowerby III, 1913)
