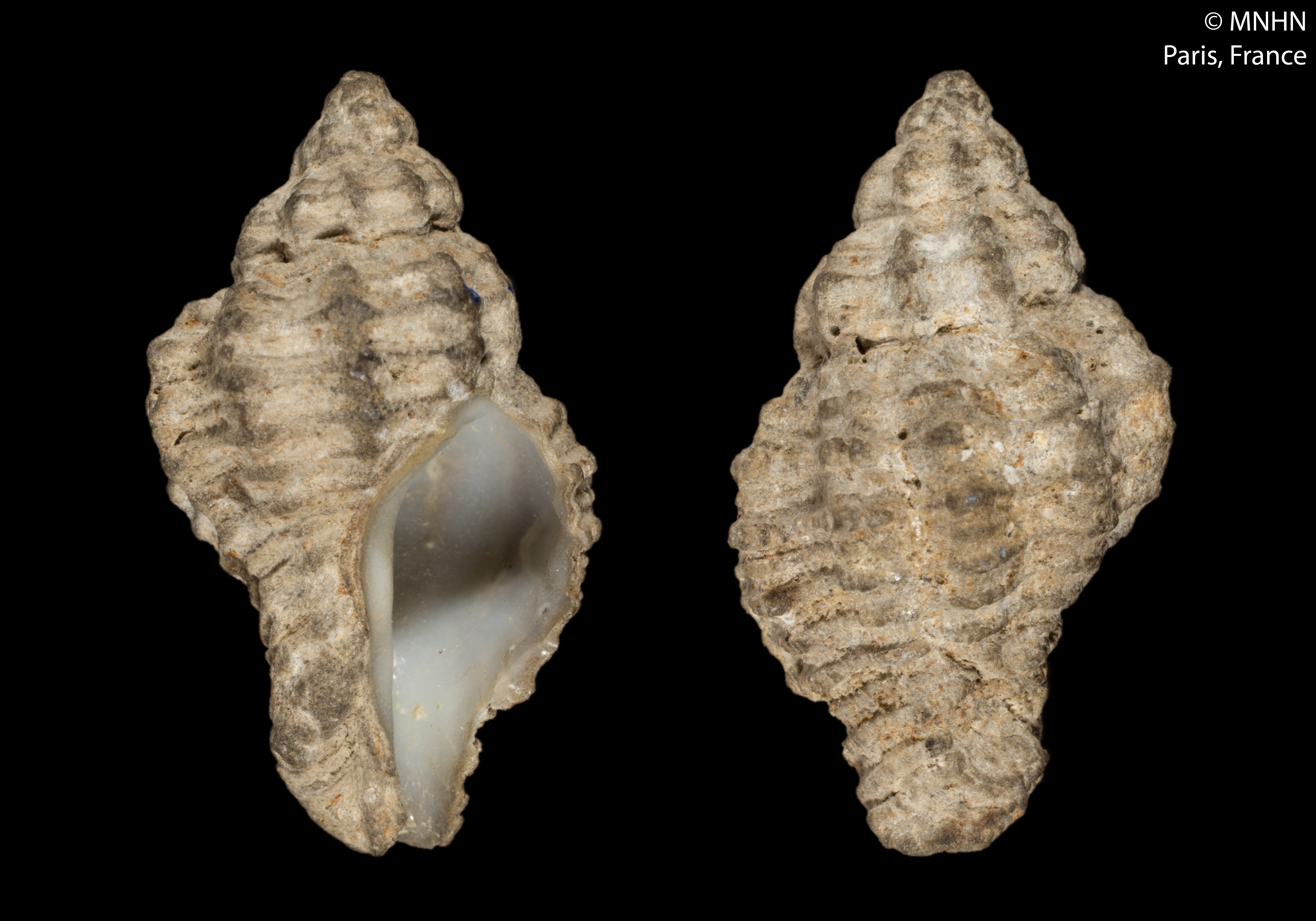
- Shell of Coralliophila basileus (syntype at MNHN, Paris)

Scientific classification
- Kingdom: Animalia
- Phylum: Mollusca
- Class: Gastropoda
- Subclass: Caenogastropoda
- Order: Neogastropoda
- Family: Muricidae
- Genus: Coralliophila
- Species: C. basileus

Binomial name
- Coralliophila basileus (Dautzenberg & Fischer H., 1896)

Synonyms
- Pseudomurex basileus Dautzenberg and Fischer, 1896; Pseudomurex monterosatoi Locard, 1897 (dubious synonym)

= Coralliophila basileus =

Species of gastropod

Coralliophila basileus is a species of sea snail, a marine gastropod mollusk in the family Muricidae, the murex snails or rock snails.

== Description ==
The length of the shell attains 23.2 mm.

== Distribution ==
This marine species was found in the Bay of Biscay.
