= Coralliophila squamosissima =

Scientific classification
- Kingdom: Animalia
- Phylum: Mollusca
- Class: Gastropoda
- Subclass: Caenogastropoda
- Order: Neogastropoda
- Family: Muricidae
- Genus: Coralliophila
- Species: C. squamosissima

Binomial name
- Coralliophila squamosissima (Smith, 1876)

Synonyms
- Rhizochilus squamosissimus Smith, 1876

Species of gastropod

Coralliophila squamosissima is a species of sea snail, a marine gastropod mollusk in the family Muricidae, the murex snails or rock snails.
