= Coralliophila vertigo =

Scientific classification
- Kingdom: Animalia
- Phylum: Mollusca
- Class: Gastropoda
- Subclass: Caenogastropoda
- Order: Neogastropoda
- Superfamily: Muricoidea
- Family: Muricidae
- Subfamily: Coralliophilinae
- Genus: Coralliophila
- Species: C. vertigo

Binomial name
- Coralliophila vertigo (Kosuge, 1986)

Species of gastropod

Coralliophila vertigo is a species of sea snail, a marine gastropod mollusk, in the family Muricidae, the murex snails or rock snails.
