= Coralliophila cumingii =

Scientific classification
- Kingdom: Animalia
- Phylum: Mollusca
- Class: Gastropoda
- Subclass: Caenogastropoda
- Order: Neogastropoda
- Family: Muricidae
- Genus: Coralliophila
- Species: C. cumingii

Binomial name
- Coralliophila cumingii (H. Adams & A. Adams, 1864)

Synonyms
- Campulotus cumingii H. Adams & A. Adams, 1864; Coralliobia cumingii (H. Adams & A. Adams, 1864); Magilus cumingii (H. Adams & A. Adams, 1864)

Species of gastropod

Coralliophila cumingii is a species of sea snail, a marine gastropod mollusk, in the family Muricidae, the murex snails or rock snails.
