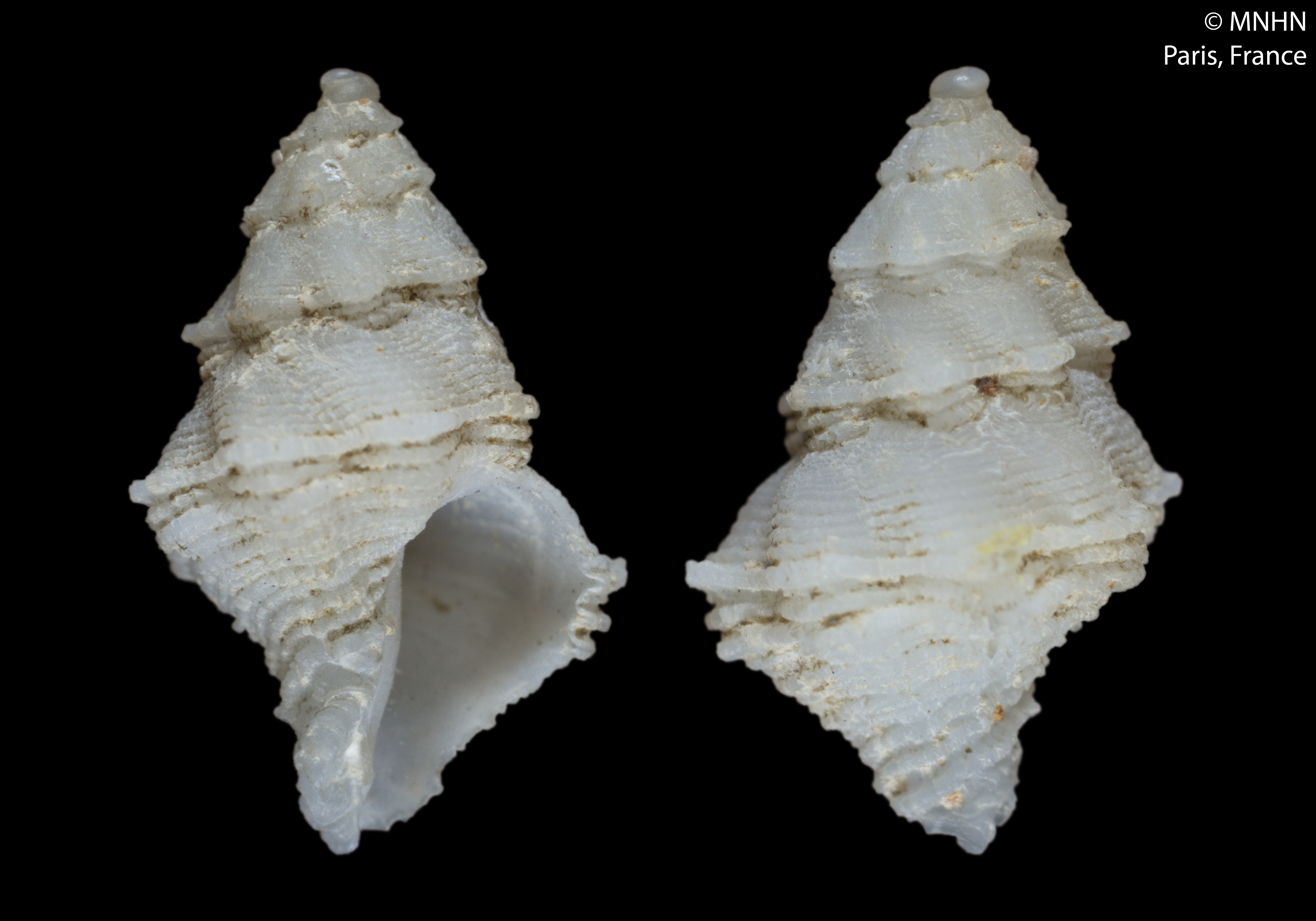
- Shell of Coralliophila candidissima (holotype at MNHN, Paris)

Scientific classification
- Kingdom: Animalia
- Phylum: Mollusca
- Class: Gastropoda
- Subclass: Caenogastropoda
- Order: Neogastropoda
- Family: Muricidae
- Genus: Coralliophila
- Species: C. candidissima

Binomial name
- Coralliophila candidissima Oliverio, 2008

= Coralliophila candidissima =

Species of gastropod

Coralliophila candidissima is a species of sea snail, a marine gastropod mollusc in the family Muricidae, the murex snails or rock snails.

== Description ==
The length of the shell attains 9 mm.

== Distribution ==
This marine species occurs off New Caledonia.
