= Coralliophila meyendorffii =

Scientific classification
- Kingdom: Animalia
- Phylum: Mollusca
- Class: Gastropoda
- Subclass: Caenogastropoda
- Order: Neogastropoda
- Family: Muricidae
- Genus: Coralliophila
- Species: C. meyendorffii

Binomial name
- Coralliophila meyendorffii (Calcara, 1845)

Synonyms
- Murex meyendorffii Calcara, 1845; Pleurotomoides obliquispira Nordsieck, 1977

Species of gastropod

Coralliophila meyendorffii is a species of sea snail, a marine gastropod mollusk in the family Muricidae, the murex snails or rock snails.
