= Coralliophila bracteata =

Scientific classification
- Kingdom: Animalia
- Phylum: Mollusca
- Class: Gastropoda
- Subclass: Caenogastropoda
- Order: Neogastropoda
- Superfamily: Muricoidea
- Family: Muricidae
- Subfamily: Coralliophilinae
- Genus: Coralliophila
- Species: †C. bracteata

Binomial name
- †Coralliophila bracteata (Brocchi, 1814)

Synonyms
- Murex bracteatus Brocchi, 1814

Extinct species of gastropod

Coralliophila bracteata is an extinct species of sea snail, a marine gastropod mollusk, in the family Muricidae, the murex snails or rock snails.
