= Coralliophila elaborata =

Scientific classification
- Kingdom: Animalia
- Phylum: Mollusca
- Class: Gastropoda
- Subclass: Caenogastropoda
- Order: Neogastropoda
- Family: Muricidae
- Genus: Coralliophila
- Species: C. elaborata

Binomial name
- Coralliophila elaborata H. Adams & A. Adams, 1864

Species of gastropod

Coralliophila elaborata is a species of sea snail, a marine gastropod mollusk, in the family Muricidae, the murex snails or rock snails.

== Distribution ==
This species occurs in Hawaiian Islands.
