= Coralliophila nux =

Scientific classification
- Kingdom: Animalia
- Phylum: Mollusca
- Class: Gastropoda
- Subclass: Caenogastropoda
- Order: Neogastropoda
- Superfamily: Muricoidea
- Family: Muricidae
- Subfamily: Coralliophilinae
- Genus: Coralliophila
- Species: C. nux

Binomial name
- Coralliophila nux (Reeve, 1846)

Synonyms
- Purpura osculans C. B. Adams, 1852

Species of gastropod

Coralliophila nux is a species of sea snail, a marine gastropod mollusk, in the family Muricidae, the murex snails or rock snails.
