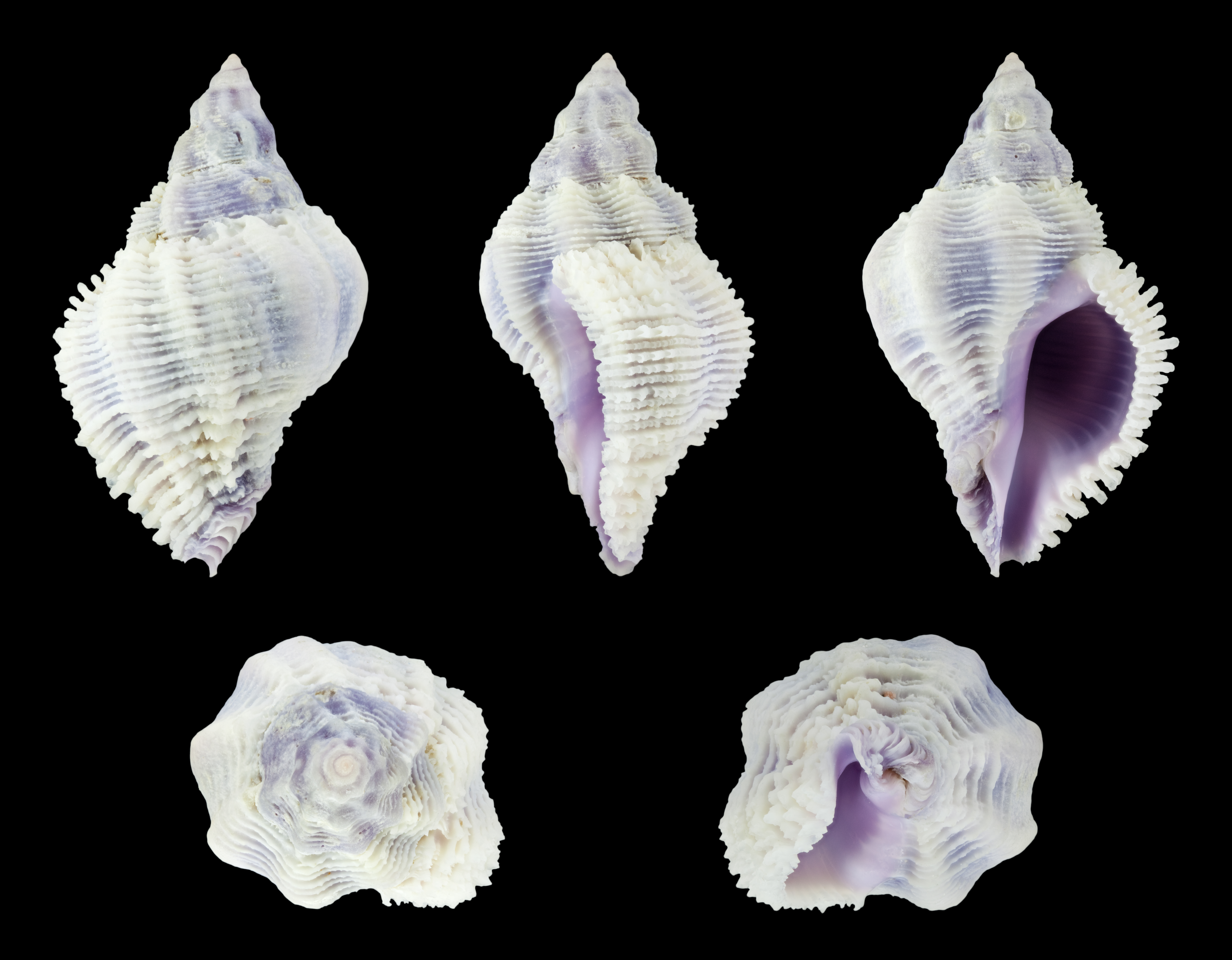
- Shell of Coralliophila costularis (Lamarck, 1816)

Scientific classification
- Kingdom: Animalia
- Phylum: Mollusca
- Class: Gastropoda
- Subclass: Caenogastropoda
- Order: Neogastropoda
- Family: Muricidae
- Genus: Coralliophila
- Species: C. costularis

Binomial name
- Coralliophila costularis (Lamarck, 1816)

Synonyms
- Murex costularis Lamarck, 1816

= Coralliophila costularis =

Species of gastropod

Coralliophila costularis is a species of sea snail, a marine gastropod mollusk in the family Muricidae, the murex snails or rock snails.
