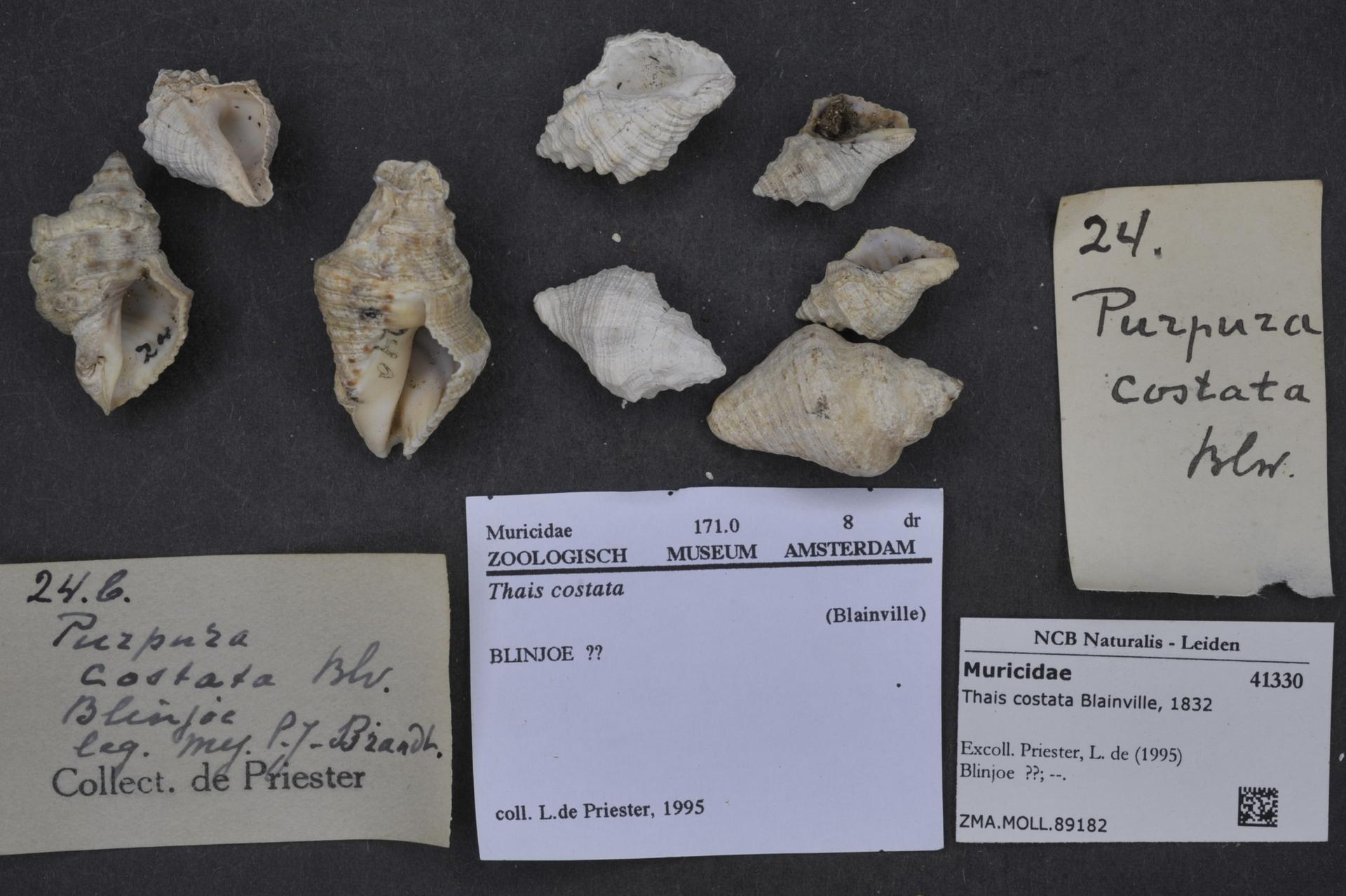
- Shell of Coralliophila costata (specimen at Naturalis Biodiversity Center)

Scientific classification
- Kingdom: Animalia
- Phylum: Mollusca
- Class: Gastropoda
- Subclass: Caenogastropoda
- Order: Neogastropoda
- Family: Muricidae
- Genus: Coralliophila
- Species: C. costata

Binomial name
- Coralliophila costata (Blainville, 1832)

Synonyms
- Purpura costata Blainville, 1832

= Coralliophila costata =

Species of gastropod

Coralliophila costata is a species of sea snail, a marine gastropod mollusk, in the family Muricidae, the murex snails or rock snails.

== Description ==
The length of the shell attains 23.9 mm.

== Distribution ==
This species occurs in the Pacific Ocean off Mexico.
