= Coralliophila richardi =

Scientific classification
- Kingdom: Animalia
- Phylum: Mollusca
- Class: Gastropoda
- Subclass: Caenogastropoda
- Order: Neogastropoda
- Family: Muricidae
- Genus: Coralliophila
- Species: C. richardi

Binomial name
- Coralliophila richardi (P. Fischer, 1882)

Synonyms
- Murex richardi Fischer P., 1882; Coralliophila lactuca Dall, 1889a

Species of gastropod

Coralliophila richardi is a species of sea snail, a marine gastropod mollusk in the family Muricidae, the murex snails or rock snails.
