= Coralliophila juliamoralesae =

Scientific classification
- Kingdom: Animalia
- Phylum: Mollusca
- Class: Gastropoda
- Subclass: Caenogastropoda
- Order: Neogastropoda
- Family: Muricidae
- Genus: Coralliophila
- Species: C. juliamoralesae

Binomial name
- Coralliophila juliamoralesae Smriglio, Mariottini & Engl, 2002

Species of gastropod

Coralliophila juliamoralesae is a species of sea snail, a marine gastropod mollusk in the family Muricidae, the murex snails or rock snails.
