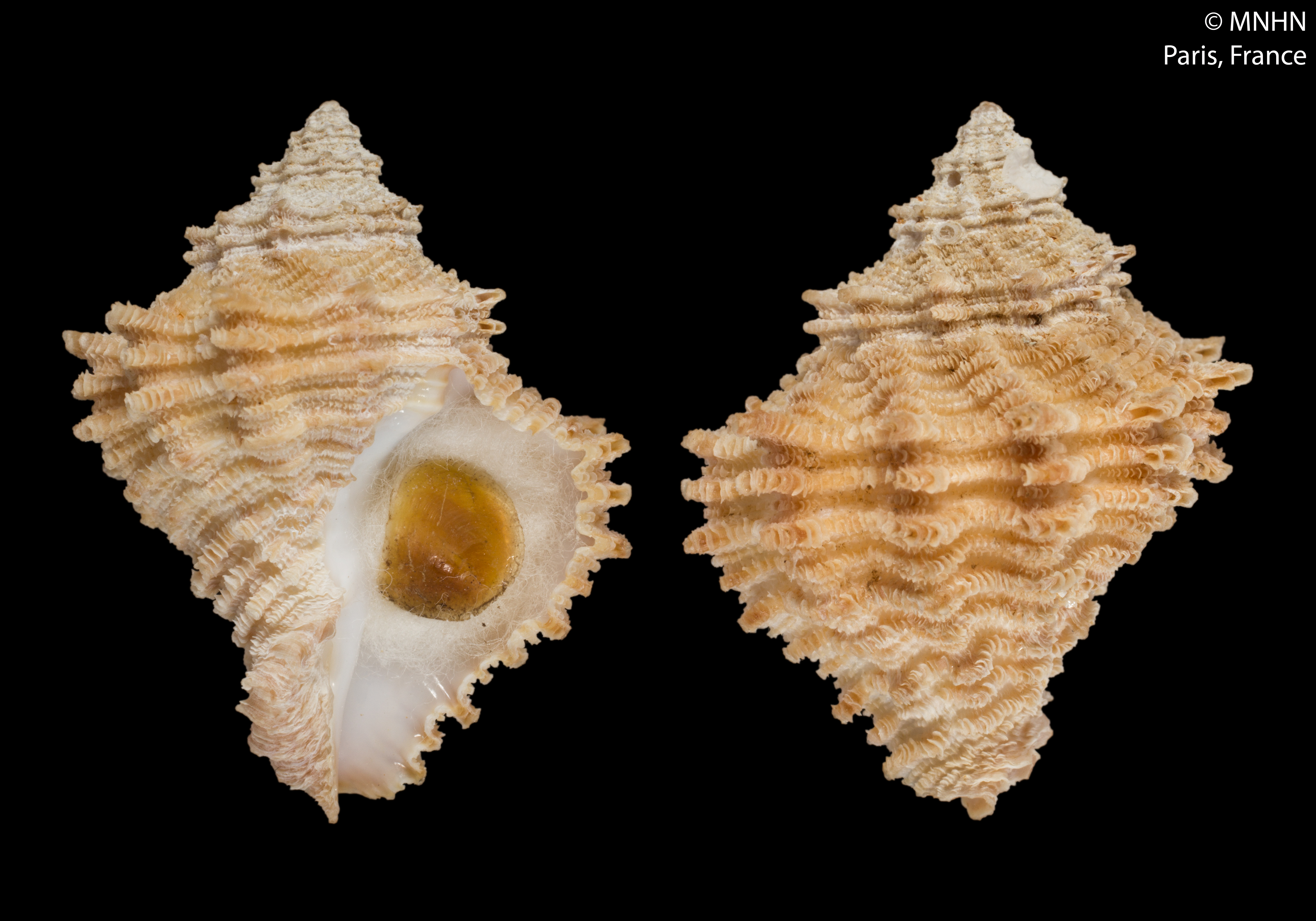
- Shell of Coralliophila mandji (syntype at MNHN, Paris)

Scientific classification
- Kingdom: Animalia
- Phylum: Mollusca
- Class: Gastropoda
- Subclass: Caenogastropoda
- Order: Neogastropoda
- Superfamily: Muricoidea
- Family: Muricidae
- Subfamily: Coralliophilinae
- Genus: Coralliophila
- Species: C. mandji

Binomial name
- Coralliophila mandji P. A. Bernard, 1989

= Coralliophila mandji =

Species of gastropod

Coralliophila mandji is a species of sea snail, a marine gastropod mollusk, in the family Muricidae, the murex snails or rock snails.

== Distribution ==
This species occurs in the Atlantic Ocean off Gabon.
