= Coralliophila elvirae =

Scientific classification
- Kingdom: Animalia
- Phylum: Mollusca
- Class: Gastropoda
- Subclass: Caenogastropoda
- Order: Neogastropoda
- Family: Muricidae
- Genus: Coralliophila
- Species: C. elvirae

Binomial name
- Coralliophila elvirae D'Attilio & Emerson, 1980

Species of gastropod

Coralliophila elvirae is a species of sea snail, a marine gastropod mollusk, in the family Muricidae, the murex snails or rock snails.
