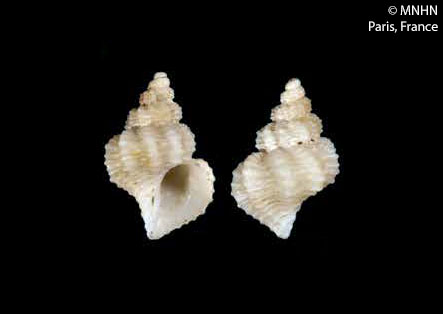
- Shell of Coralliophila aberrans (specimen at MNHN, Paris)

Scientific classification
- Kingdom: Animalia
- Phylum: Mollusca
- Class: Gastropoda
- Subclass: Caenogastropoda
- Order: Neogastropoda
- Family: Muricidae
- Genus: Coralliophila
- Species: C. aberrans

Binomial name
- Coralliophila aberrans (C. B. Adams, 1850)

= Coralliophila aberrans =

Species of gastropod

Coralliophila aberrans is a species of sea snail, a marine gastropod mollusk in the family Muricidae, the murex snails or rock snails.

== Distribution ==
This marine species occurs off French Guiana.
