= Coralliophila patruelis =

Scientific classification
- Kingdom: Animalia
- Phylum: Mollusca
- Class: Gastropoda
- Subclass: Caenogastropoda
- Order: Neogastropoda
- Superfamily: Muricoidea
- Family: Muricidae
- Subfamily: Coralliophilinae
- Genus: Coralliophila
- Species: C. patruelis

Binomial name
- Coralliophila patruelis (E. A. Smith, 1890)

Synonyms
- Murex (Ocinebra) patruelis E. A. Smith, 1890

Species of gastropod

Coralliophila patruelis is a species of sea snail, a marine gastropod mollusk, in the family Muricidae, the murex snails or rock snails.
