= Coralliophila carnosa =

Scientific classification
- Kingdom: Animalia
- Phylum: Mollusca
- Class: Gastropoda
- Subclass: Caenogastropoda
- Order: Neogastropoda
- Family: Muricidae
- Genus: Coralliophila
- Species: C. carnosa

Binomial name
- Coralliophila carnosa Kosuge, 1986

Species of gastropod

Coralliophila carnosa is a species of sea snail, a marine gastropod mollusk, in the family Muricidae, the murex snails or rock snails.
