= Coralliophila panormitana =

Scientific classification
- Kingdom: Animalia
- Phylum: Mollusca
- Class: Gastropoda
- Subclass: Caenogastropoda
- Order: Neogastropoda
- Family: Muricidae
- Genus: Coralliophila
- Species: C. panormitana

Binomial name
- Coralliophila panormitana (Monterosato, 1869)

Species of gastropod

Coralliophila panormitana is a species of sea snail, a marine gastropod mollusk in the family Muricidae, the murex snails or rock snails.
