= Coralliophila curacaoensis =

Scientific classification
- Kingdom: Animalia
- Phylum: Mollusca
- Class: Gastropoda
- Subclass: Caenogastropoda
- Order: Neogastropoda
- Family: Muricidae
- Genus: Coralliophila
- Species: C. curacaoensis

Binomial name
- Coralliophila curacaoensis Potkamp & Hoeksema, 2017

Species of gastropod

Coralliophila curacaoensis is a species of sea snail, a marine gastropod mollusk, in the family Muricidae, the murex snails or rock snails.

== Distribution ==
This species occurs in Curaçao.
