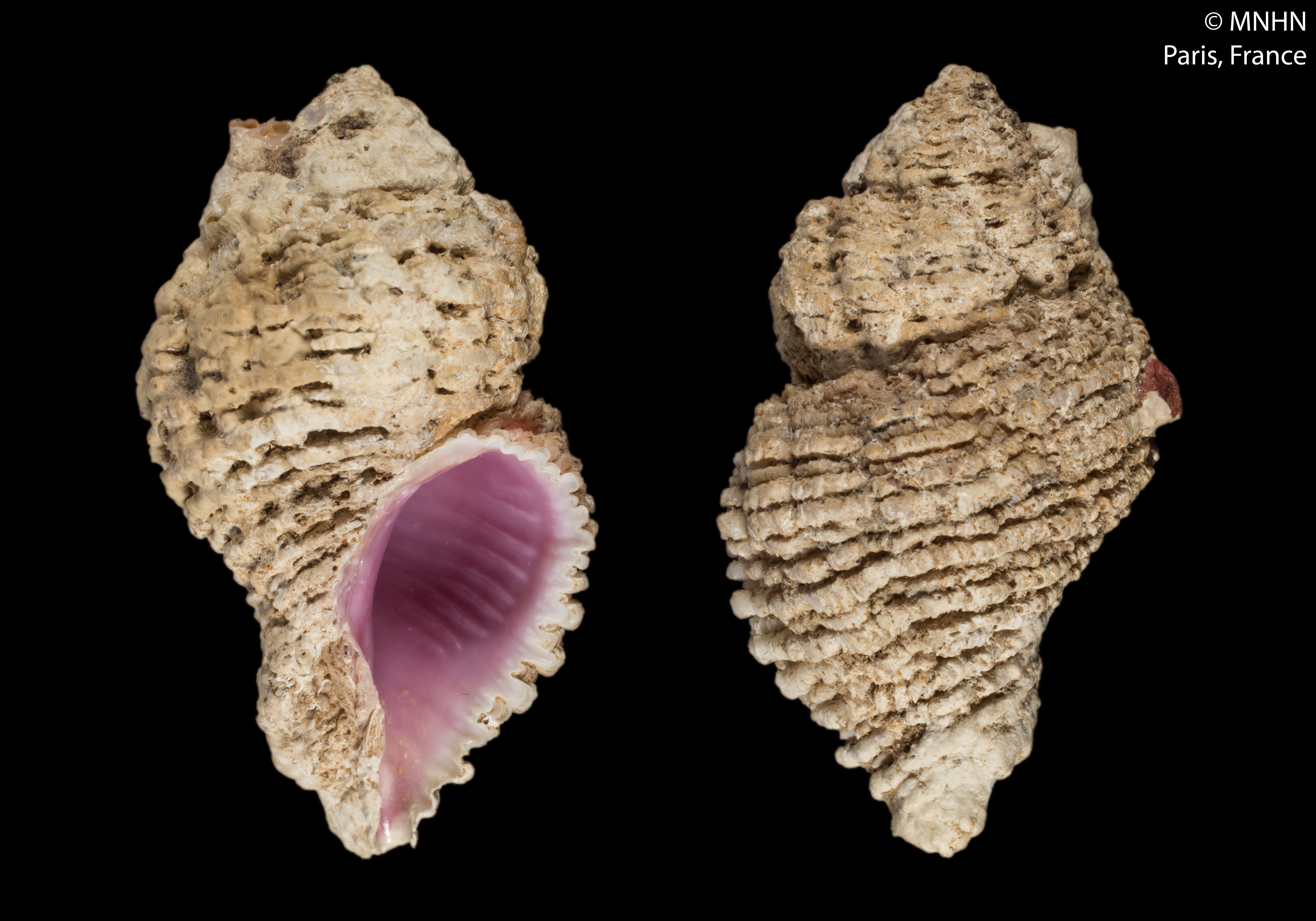
- Shell of Coralliophila australis (holotype at MNHN, Paris)

Scientific classification
- Kingdom: Animalia
- Phylum: Mollusca
- Class: Gastropoda
- Subclass: Caenogastropoda
- Order: Neogastropoda
- Family: Muricidae
- Genus: Coralliophila
- Species: C. australis

Binomial name
- Coralliophila australis Oliverio, 2009

= Coralliophila australis =

Species of gastropod

Coralliophila australis is a species of sea snail, a marine gastropod mollusc in the family Muricidae, the murex snails or rock snails.

== Description ==
The length of the shell attains 37.5 mm.

Coralliophila australis is predator that eats sessile prey.

== Distribution ==
This marine species occurs off the Austral Islands, French Polynesia.
