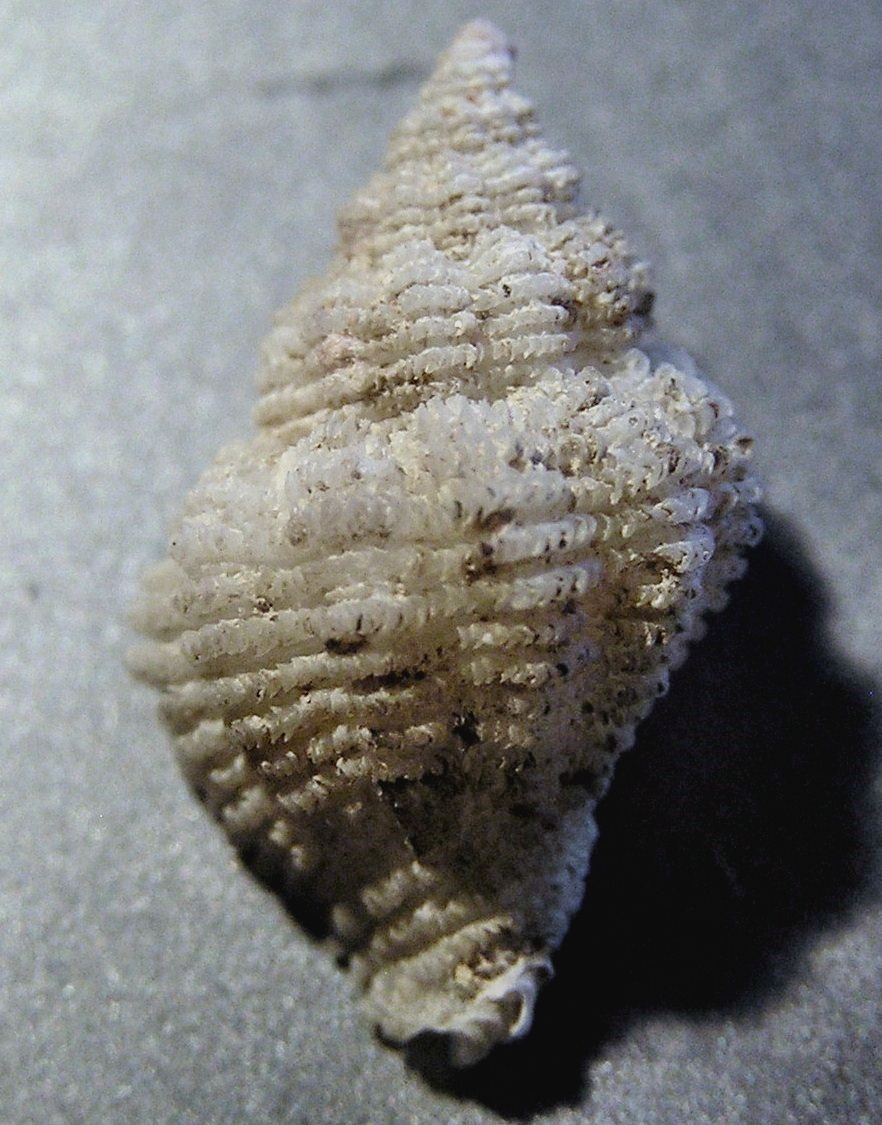
- Coralliophila inflata

Scientific classification
- Kingdom: Animalia
- Phylum: Mollusca
- Class: Gastropoda
- Subclass: Caenogastropoda
- Order: Neogastropoda
- Superfamily: Muricoidea
- Family: Muricidae
- Subfamily: Coralliophilinae
- Genus: Coralliophila
- Species: C. inflata

Binomial name
- Coralliophila inflata (Dunker, 1847)

Synonyms
- Coralliobia akibumii Kira, 1959; Fusus inflatus Dunker, 1847

= Coralliophila inflata =

Species of gastropod

Coralliophila inflata is a species of sea snail, a marine gastropod mollusk, in the family Muricidae, the murex snails or rock snails.
