= Coralliophila adansoni =

Scientific classification
- Kingdom: Animalia
- Phylum: Mollusca
- Class: Gastropoda
- Subclass: Caenogastropoda
- Order: Neogastropoda
- Family: Muricidae
- Genus: Coralliophila
- Species: C. adansoni

Binomial name
- Coralliophila adansoni Kosuge & Fernandes, 1989

Species of gastropod

Coralliophila adansoni is a species of sea snail, a marine gastropod mollusk in the family Muricidae, the murex snails or rock snails.
