= Coralliophila kalafuti =

Scientific classification
- Kingdom: Animalia
- Phylum: Mollusca
- Class: Gastropoda
- Subclass: Caenogastropoda
- Order: Neogastropoda
- Family: Muricidae
- Genus: Coralliophila
- Species: C. kalafuti

Binomial name
- Coralliophila kalafuti (Petuch, 1987)

Species of gastropod

Coralliophila kalafuti is a species of sea snail, a marine gastropod mollusk in the family Muricidae, the murex snails or rock snails.

== Description ==
Original description: "Shell somewhat fusiform in shape, with inflated body whorl and flaring lip; spire elevated; body whorl and spire whorls ornamented with numerous raised spiral threads, which give shell rough appearance; aperture very wide and flaring; columella with large, flaring parietal shield; parietal shield detached from shell along edges; shoulder rounded; shell color pale lilac; interior of aperture lilac-purple; columella white."

== Distribution ==
Locus typicus: "Off Harry Harris State Park,
South-Eastern end of Key Largo, Florida Keys, USA."
