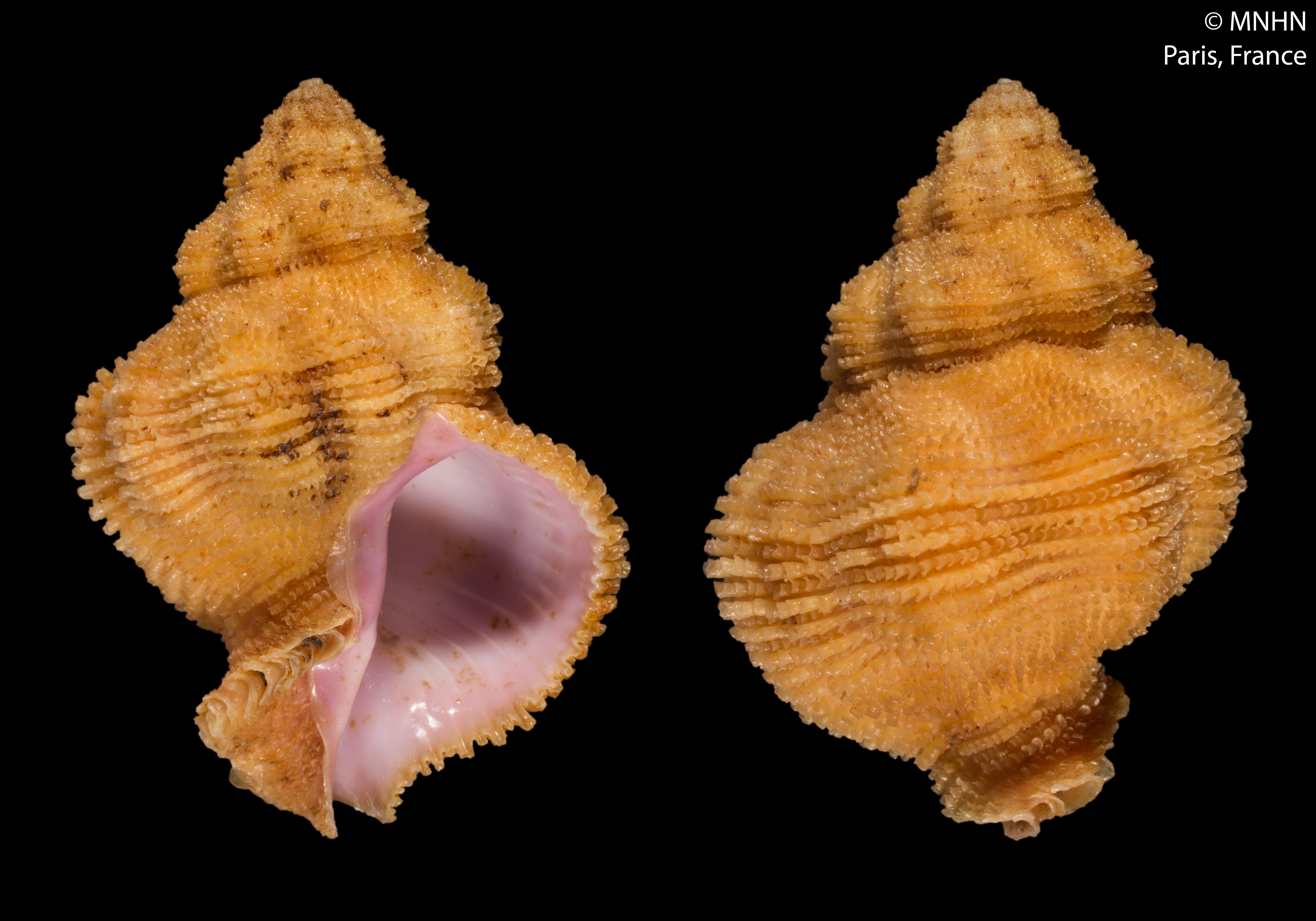
- Shell of Coralliophila francoisi (holotype at MNHN, Paris)

Scientific classification
- Kingdom: Animalia
- Phylum: Mollusca
- Class: Gastropoda
- Subclass: Caenogastropoda
- Order: Neogastropoda
- Family: Muricidae
- Genus: Coralliophila
- Species: C. francoisi

Binomial name
- Coralliophila francoisi Bozzetti, 2006

= Coralliophila francoisi =

Species of gastropod

Coralliophila francoisi is a species of sea snail, a marine gastropod mollusk in the family Muricidae, the murex snails or rock snails.

== Description ==
The length of the shell attains 42.3 mm.

== Distribution ==
This marine species occurs off Madagascar.
