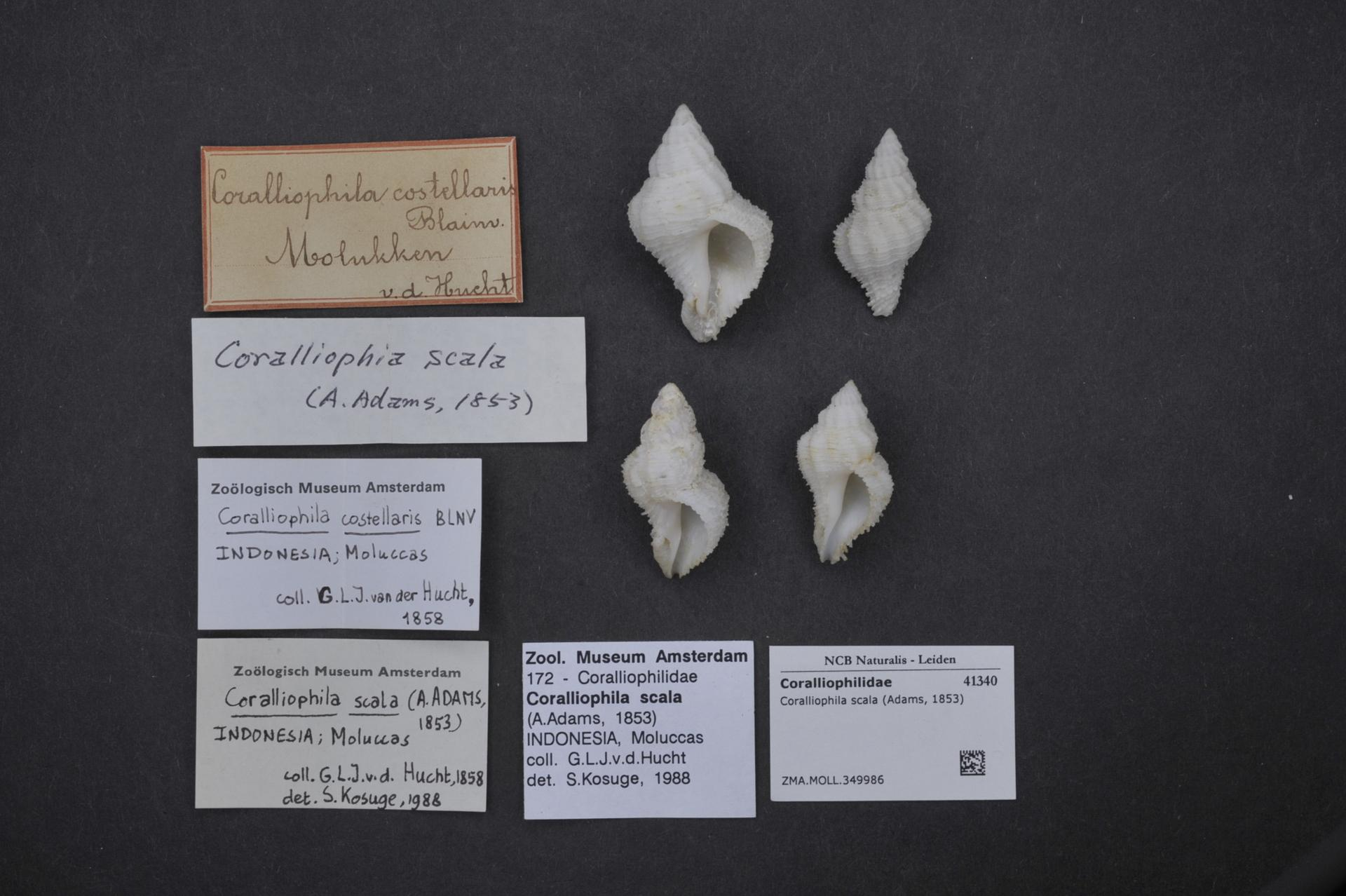
- Coralliophila scala shells

Scientific classification
- Kingdom: Animalia
- Phylum: Mollusca
- Class: Gastropoda
- Subclass: Caenogastropoda
- Order: Neogastropoda
- Superfamily: Muricoidea
- Family: Muricidae
- Subfamily: Coralliophilinae
- Genus: Coralliophila
- Species: C. scala

Binomial name
- Coralliophila scala (A. Adams, 1854)

Synonyms
- Coralliophila asperrima H. Adams & A. Adams, 1864

= Coralliophila scala =

Species of gastropod

Coralliophila scala is a species of sea snail, a marine gastropod mollusk, in the family Muricidae, the murex snails or rock snails.
