= Coralliophila curta =

Scientific classification
- Kingdom: Animalia
- Phylum: Mollusca
- Class: Gastropoda
- Subclass: Caenogastropoda
- Order: Neogastropoda
- Family: Muricidae
- Genus: Coralliophila
- Species: C. curta

Binomial name
- Coralliophila curta G. B. Sowerby III, 1894

Species of sea snail

Coralliophila curta is a species of sea snail, a marine gastropod mollusk, in the family Muricidae, the murex snails or rock snails.
