= Licina =

Licina is a surname and species name.

== Surname ==
- Dusan Licina (born 1986), Serbian engineer
- Enad Ličina (born 1979), Serbian boxer
- John Licina (born 1976), French footballer
- Luiza Licina-Bode (born 1972), German politician

== Species name ==
- Emozamia licina, a sea snail
- Odostomia licina, a sea snail
- Pyrgulopsis licina, a freshwater snail
- Sphegina licina, a hoverfly
