= Tangaroa (disambiguation) =

Tangaroa is the Māori god of the sea.

Tangaroa may also refer to:

== Animals ==
- Anatoma tangaroa, a sea snail of family Anatomidae
- Bathymodiolus tangaroa, a mussel of family Mytilidae
- Hirtomurex tangaroa, a sea snail of family Muricidae
- Modicus tangaroa, a clingfish of family Gobiesocidae
- Tangaroa (spider), a genus of uloborid spiders
- Zetela tangaroa, a sea snail of family Solariellidae

== People ==
- Tanga Roa (born 1983), Tongan-American professional wrestler
- Tangaroa Tangaroa (1921–2009), Cook Islands politician

== Other uses ==
- "Tangaroa", a 2007 electronic track by New Zealand artist Tiki Taane
- Tangaroa (album), by New Zealand metal band Alien Weaponry
- RV Tangaroa, a research vessel belonging to the National Institute of Water and Atmospheric Research
- Tangaroa College, Otara, Auckland, New Zealand
- Tangaroa Expedition, a 2006 raft journey from Peru to Polynesia
