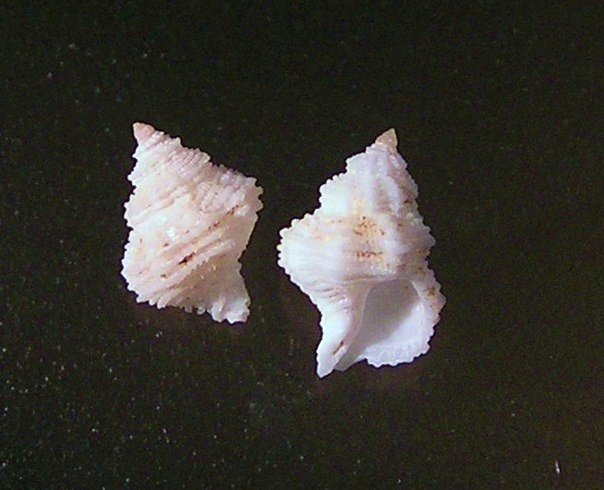
- Two shells of Mipus crebrilamellosus

Scientific classification
- Kingdom: Animalia
- Phylum: Mollusca
- Class: Gastropoda
- Subclass: Caenogastropoda
- Order: Neogastropoda
- Superfamily: Muricoidea
- Family: Muricidae
- Subfamily: Coralliophilinae
- Genus: Mipus de Gregorio, 1885

Type species
- Trophon gyratus Hinds, R.B., 1844

Species
- See text

= Mipus =

Genus of gastropods

Mipus is a genus of sea snails, marine gastropod mollusks in the subfamily Coralliophilinae of the family Muricidae, the murex snails or rock snails.

== Species ==
Species within the genus Mipus include:

- Mipus alis Oliverio, 2008
- Mipus arbutum (Woolacott, 1954)
- Mipus basicostatus Kosuge, 1988
- Mipus boucheti Oliverio, 2008
- Mipus brinkae Kosuge, 1992
- Mipus coriolisi Kosuge & Oliverio, 2004
- Mipus crebrilamellosus (G.B. Sowerby III, 1913)
- Mipus eugeniae (Bernardi, 1853)
- Mipus fusiformis (Martens, 1902)
- Mipus gyratus (Hinds, R.B., 1844)
- Mipus intermedius Kosuge, 1985
- Mipus isosceles (Barnard, 1959)
- Mipus mamimarumai (Kosuge, 1981)
- Mipus matsumotoi Kosuge, 1985
- Mipus miyukiae Kosuge, 1985
- Mipus nodosus (A. Adams, 1854)
- Mipus rosaceus (E.A. Smith, 1903)
- Mipus sugitanii Kosuge, 1985
- Mipus tomlini (van Regteren Altena, 1950)
- Mipus tonganus Oliverio, 2008
- Mipus tortuosus (Azuma, 1961)
- Mipus vicdani (Kosuge, 1980)

Species brought into synonymy

- Mipus hotei Kosuge, 1985: synonym of Coralliophila hotei (Kosuge, 1985)
- Mipus ovoideus Kosuge, 1985: synonym of Coralliophila ovoidea (Kosuge, 1985)
