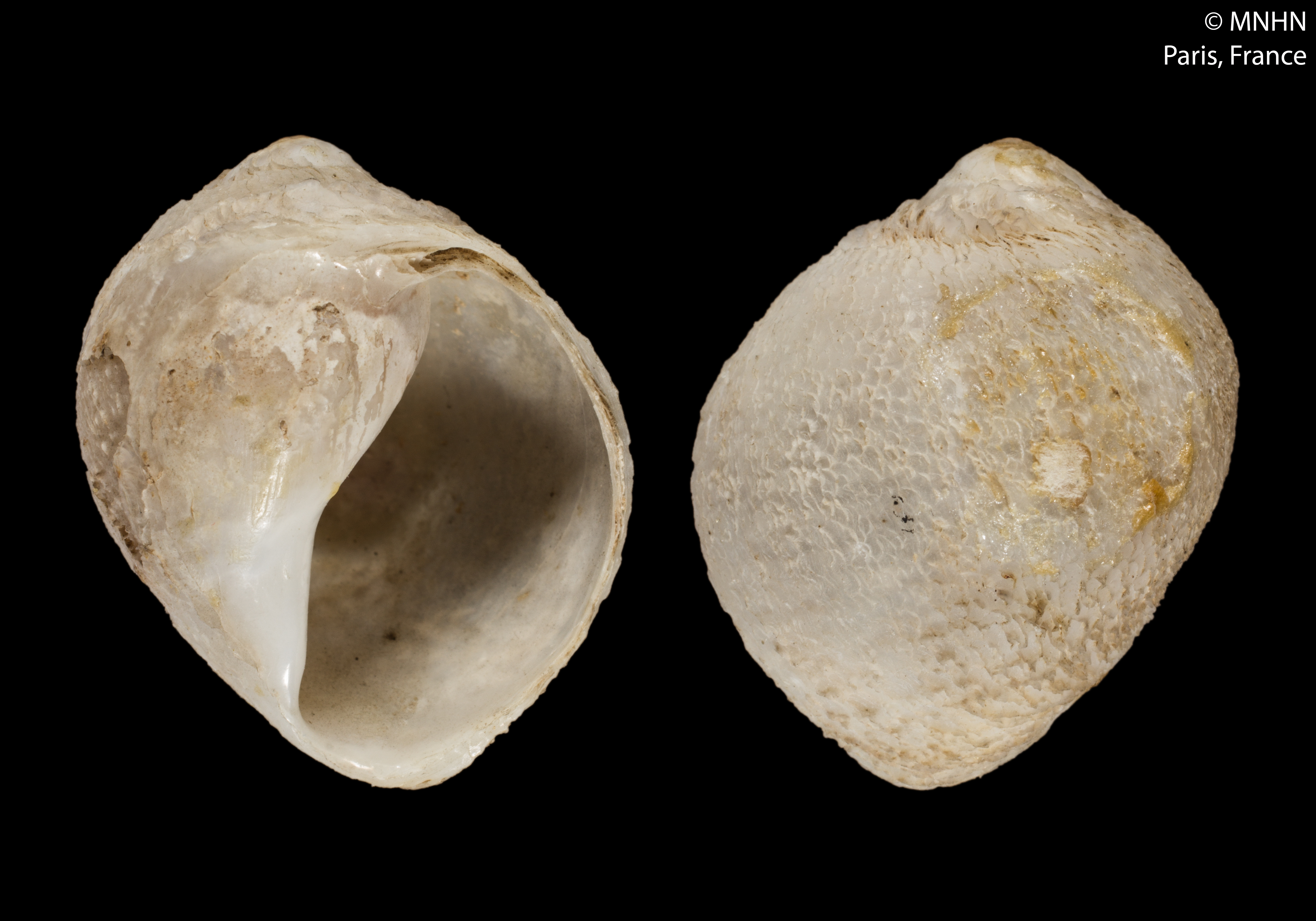

Scientific classification
- Kingdom: Animalia
- Phylum: Mollusca
- Class: Gastropoda
- Subclass: Caenogastropoda
- Order: Neogastropoda
- Superfamily: Muricoidea
- Family: Muricidae
- Subfamily: Coralliophilinae
- Genus: Leptoconchus
- Species: L. peronii

Binomial name
- Leptoconchus peronii (Lamarck, 1818)

Synonyms
- Leptoconchus schrenkii Lischke, 1871; Leptoconchus striatus Rüppell, 1835; Magilus peronii Lamarck, 1818; Magilus striatus (Rüppell, 1835)

= Leptoconchus peronii =

Species of gastropod

Leptoconchus peronii is a species of sea snail, a marine gastropod mollusk, in the family Muricidae, the murex snails or rock snails.
