= Hirtomurex nakamurai =

Scientific classification
- Kingdom: Animalia
- Phylum: Mollusca
- Class: Gastropoda
- Subclass: Caenogastropoda
- Order: Neogastropoda
- Superfamily: Muricoidea
- Family: Muricidae
- Subfamily: Coralliophilinae
- Genus: Hirtomurex
- Species: H. nakamurai

Binomial name
- Hirtomurex nakamurai Kosuge, 1985

Species of gastropod

Hirtomurex nakamurai is a species of sea snail. It is a marine gastropod mollusk, in the family Muricidae, which are the murex snails or rock snails.

== Distribution ==
This species is found in the New Zealand Exclusive Economic Zone.
