= Hirtomurex isshikiensis =

Scientific classification
- Kingdom: Animalia
- Phylum: Mollusca
- Class: Gastropoda
- Subclass: Caenogastropoda
- Order: Neogastropoda
- Superfamily: Muricoidea
- Family: Muricidae
- Subfamily: Coralliophilinae
- Genus: Hirtomurex
- Species: H. isshikiensis

Binomial name
- Hirtomurex isshikiensis (Shikama, 1971)

Synonyms
- Coralliophila isshikiensis Shikama, 1971

Species of gastropod

Hirtomurex isshikiensis is a species of sea snail, a marine gastropod mollusk, in the family Muricidae, the murex snails or rock snails.
