= Mipus tortuosus =

Scientific classification
- Kingdom: Animalia
- Phylum: Mollusca
- Class: Gastropoda
- Subclass: Caenogastropoda
- Order: Neogastropoda
- Superfamily: Muricoidea
- Family: Muricidae
- Subfamily: Coralliophilinae
- Genus: Mipus
- Species: M. tortuosus

Binomial name
- Mipus tortuosus (Azuma, 1961)

Synonyms
- Latiaxis tortuosus Azuma, 1961

Species of gastropod

Mipus tortuosus is a species of sea snail, a marine gastropod mollusk, in the family Muricidae, the murex snails or rock snails.
