= Leptoconchus inpileus =

Scientific classification
- Kingdom: Animalia
- Phylum: Mollusca
- Class: Gastropoda
- Subclass: Caenogastropoda
- Order: Neogastropoda
- Superfamily: Muricoidea
- Family: Muricidae
- Subfamily: Coralliophilinae
- Genus: Leptoconchus
- Species: L. inpileus

Binomial name
- Leptoconchus inpileus A. Gittenberger & E. Gittenberger, 2011

Species of gastropod

Leptoconchus inpileus is a species of sea snail, a marine gastropod mollusk, in the family Muricidae, the murex snails or rock snails.
