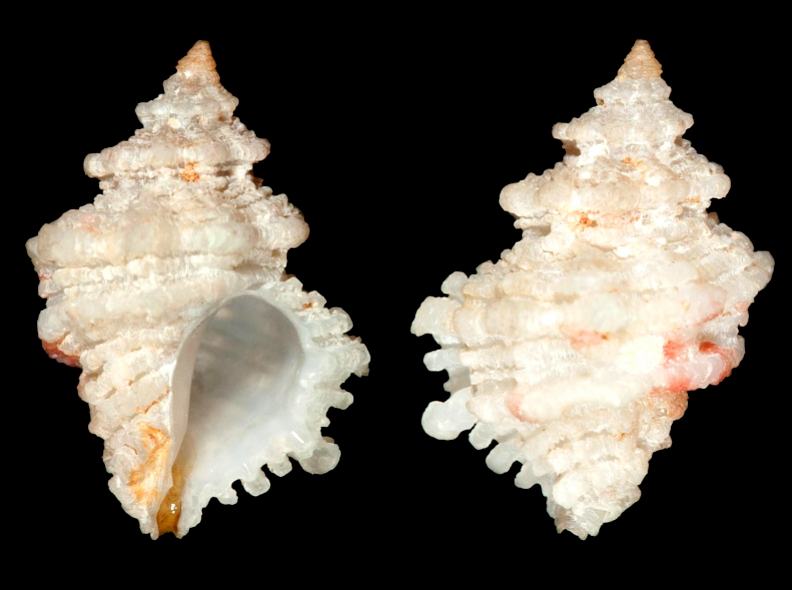
- Shell of Babelomurex pacei (holotype at the Smithsonian Institution)

Scientific classification
- Kingdom: Animalia
- Phylum: Mollusca
- Class: Gastropoda
- Subclass: Caenogastropoda
- Order: Neogastropoda
- Family: Muricidae
- Subfamily: Coralliophilinae
- Genus: Babelomurex
- Species: B. pacei

Binomial name
- Babelomurex pacei (Petuch, 1987)

Synonyms
- Coralliophila pacei Petuch, 1987 superseded combination

= Babelomurex pacei =

Species of gastropod

Babelomurex pacei is a species of sea snail, a marine gastropod mollusk, in the family Muricidae, the murex snails or rock snails.

== Description ==
Original description: "Shell small for genus, with ovate, inflated body whorl and elevated, scalariform spire; body whorl ornamented with 2 large fimbriated spiral cords, one at shoulder and one below (anterior to) mid-body; 3 small squamose spiral cords between suture and large shoulder cord; 2 small squamose spiral cords between 2 large cords around anterior end; 9 low varices per whorl; large scale produced at intersection of varix and spiral cord, giving shell fimbriated appearance; shell uniformly cream-white in color."

== Distribution ==
Locus typicus: "Off Pompano outfall, Pompano Beach, Florida, USA."

This species was recently discovered off Martinique and Guadeloupe, French West Indies.
