= Quoyula =

Scientific classification
- Kingdom: Animalia
- Phylum: Mollusca
- Class: Gastropoda
- Subclass: Caenogastropoda
- Order: Neogastropoda
- Family: Muricidae
- Subfamily: Coralliophilinae
- Genus: Quoyula; Iredale, 1912

Genus of gastropods

Quoyula is a genus of sea snails, marine gastropod mollusks in the family Muricidae, the murex snails or rock snails.

This genus has become a synonym of Coralliophila H. Adams & A. Adams, 1853

== Species ==
Species within the genus Quoyula include:

- Quoyula madreporarum (Sowerby, 1832): synonym of Coralliophila monodonta (Blainville, 1832)
- Quoyula monodonta Quoy & Gaimard: synonym of Coralliophila monodonta (Blainville, 1832)
