= Liniaxis elongata =

Scientific classification
- Kingdom: Animalia
- Phylum: Mollusca
- Class: Gastropoda
- Subclass: Caenogastropoda
- Order: Neogastropoda
- Superfamily: Muricoidea
- Family: Muricidae
- Subfamily: Coralliophilinae
- Genus: Liniaxis
- Species: L. elongata

Binomial name
- Liniaxis elongata Laseron, 1955

Species of gastropod

Liniaxis elongata is a species of sea snail, a marine gastropod mollusk, in the family Muricidae, the murex snails or rock snails.
