= Rhizochilus =

Scientific classification
- Kingdom: Animalia
- Phylum: Mollusca
- Class: Gastropoda
- Subclass: Caenogastropoda
- Order: Neogastropoda
- Family: Muricidae
- Subfamily: Coralliophilinae
- Genus: Rhizochilus; Steenstrup, 1850

Genus of gastropods

Rhizochilus is a genus of sea snails, marine gastropod mollusks in the family Muricidae, the murex snails or rock snails.

== Species ==
Species within the genus Rhizochilus include:

- Rhizochilus antipathum Steenstrup, 1850

Species brought into synonymy

- Rhizochilus exaratus Pease, 1861 : synonym of Coralliophila erosa (Röding, 1798)
- Rhizochilus madreporarum Sowerby: synonym of Coralliophila monodonta (Blainville, 1832)
- Rhizochilus radula A. Adams, 1855 : synonym of Coralliophila radula (A. Adams, 1855)
- Rhizochilus squamosissimus E.A. Smith, 1876 : synonym of Coralliophila squamosissima (E.A. Smith, 1876)
- Rhizochilus teramachii Kuroda, 1953 : synonym of Rhizochilus antipathum Steenstrup, 1850
