= Babelomurex hindsi =

Scientific classification
- Kingdom: Animalia
- Phylum: Mollusca
- Class: Gastropoda
- Subclass: Caenogastropoda
- Order: Neogastropoda
- Superfamily: Muricoidea
- Family: Muricidae
- Subfamily: Coralliophilinae
- Genus: Babelomurex
- Species: B. hindsi

Binomial name
- Babelomurex hindsi (Carpenter, 1857)

Synonyms
- Latiaxis hindsi (Carpenter, 1857); Trophon hindsi P. P. Carpenter, 1857 superseded combination

Species of gastropod

Babelomurex hindsi is a species of sea snail, a marine gastropod mollusk, in the family Muricidae, the murex snails or rock snails.

== Distribution ==
This species occurs in the Pacific Ocean off Mexico, Costa Rica, Panama and Ecuador.
