= Mipus mamimarumai =

Scientific classification
- Kingdom: Animalia
- Phylum: Mollusca
- Class: Gastropoda
- Subclass: Caenogastropoda
- Order: Neogastropoda
- Superfamily: Muricoidea
- Family: Muricidae
- Subfamily: Coralliophilinae
- Genus: Mipus
- Species: M. mamimarumai

Binomial name
- Mipus mamimarumai (Kosuge, 1980)

Synonyms
- Latiaxis mamimarumai Kosuge, 1980

Species of gastropod

Mipus mamimarumai is a species of sea snail, a marine gastropod mollusk, in the family Muricidae, the murex snails or rock snails.
