= Hirtomurex scobina =

Scientific classification
- Kingdom: Animalia
- Phylum: Mollusca
- Class: Gastropoda
- Subclass: Caenogastropoda
- Order: Neogastropoda
- Superfamily: Muricoidea
- Family: Muricidae
- Subfamily: Coralliophilinae
- Genus: Hirtomurex
- Species: H. scobina

Binomial name
- Hirtomurex scobina (Kilburn, 1973)

Synonyms
- Latiaxis scobina Kilburn, 1973

Species of gastropod

Hirtomurex scobina is a species of sea snail, a marine gastropod mollusk, in the family Muricidae, the murex snails or rock snails.
