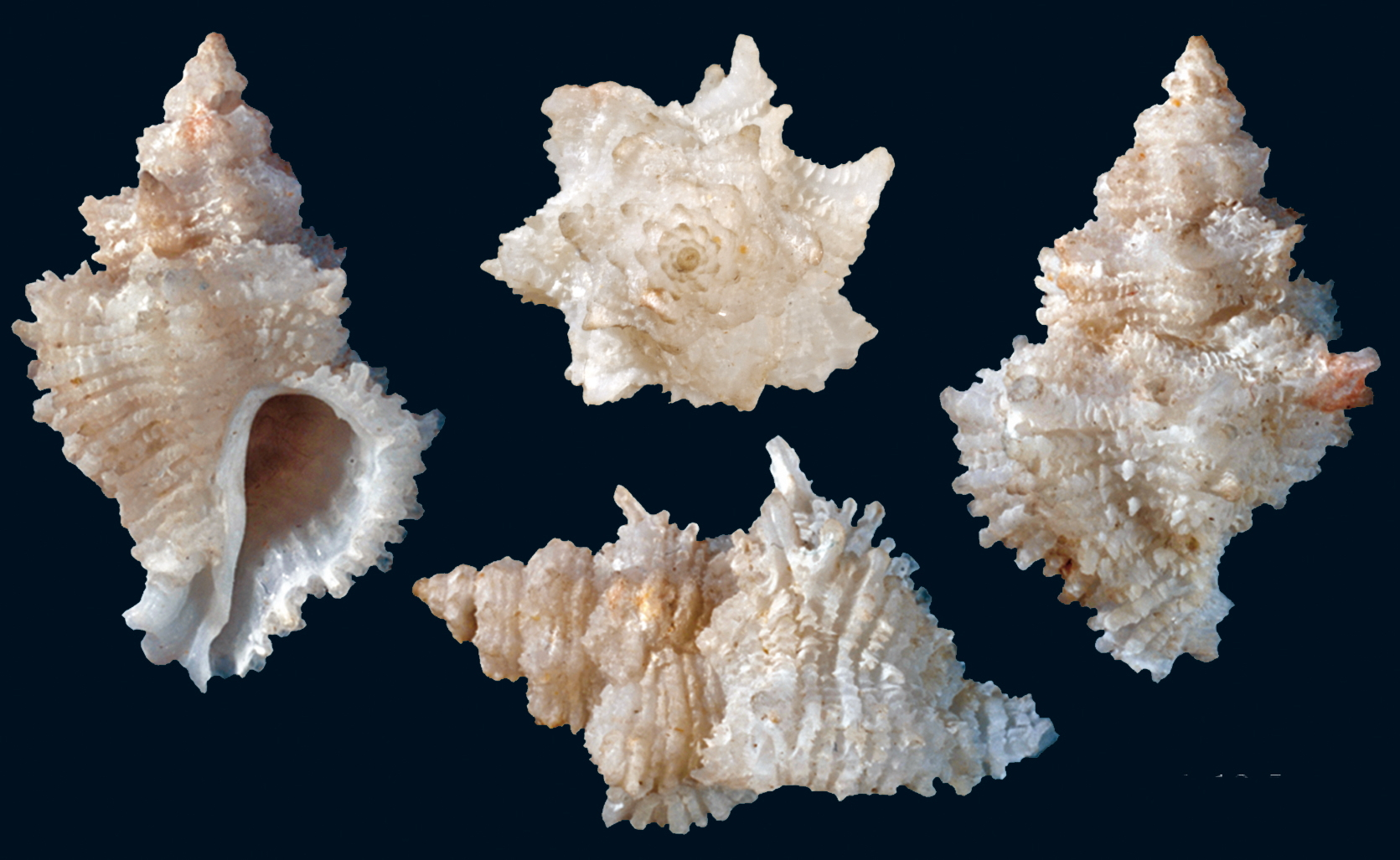
- Shell of Babelomurex rugosus (paratype at the MNHN, Paris)

Scientific classification
- Kingdom: Animalia
- Phylum: Mollusca
- Class: Gastropoda
- Subclass: Caenogastropoda
- Order: Neogastropoda
- Family: Muricidae
- Genus: Babelomurex
- Species: B. rugosus

Binomial name
- Babelomurex rugosus Garrigues, D. Lamy & Zuccon, 2022

= Babelomurex rugosus =

Species of gastropod

Babelomurex rugosus is a species of sea snail, a marine gastropod mollusc in the family Muricidae, the murex snails or rock snails. It belongs to the subfamily Coralliophilinae, a group of muricids that are typically ectoparasitic or commensal on cnidarians such as corals and gorgonians.

== Taxonomy ==
The species was described in 2022 by Bernard Garrigues, Didier Lamy and Dario Zuccon as one of six new coralliophiline species from the Antilles and French Guiana treated in the same paper, alongside Babelomurex bayeri, Babelomurex colettae, Babelomurex pruvosti and Babelomurex stupa. Paratype material is deposited in the collections of the Muséum national d'Histoire naturelle (MNHN) in Paris.

== Description ==
The length of the shell attains 6 mm.

== Distribution ==
This marine species occurs off Guadeloupe and Martinique, with its type locality lying within the Guadeloupean Exclusive Economic Zone.
