= Coralliophila turrita =

Scientific classification
- Kingdom: Animalia
- Phylum: Mollusca
- Class: Gastropoda
- Subclass: Caenogastropoda
- Order: Neogastropoda
- Superfamily: Muricoidea
- Family: Muricidae
- Subfamily: Coralliophilinae
- Genus: Coralliophila
- Species: C. turrita

Binomial name
- Coralliophila turrita G. B. Sowerby III, 1888

Species of gastropod

Coralliophila turrita is a species of sea snail, a marine gastropod mollusk, in the family Muricidae, the murex snails or rock snails.
