= Liniaxis =

Liniaxis Temporal range: Upper Pleistocene to Recent

Scientific classification
- Kingdom: Animalia
- Phylum: Mollusca
- Class: Gastropoda
- Subclass: Caenogastropoda
- Order: Neogastropoda
- Family: Muricidae
- Subfamily: Coralliophilinae
- Genus: Liniaxis; Swainson, 1840

Species
- See text

Genus of gastropods

Liniaxis is a genus of medium-sized sea snails, marine gastropod mollusks in the subfamily Coralliophilinae, the coral snails, within the family Muricidae, the murex snails and rock snails.

== Species ==
Species within the genus Liniaxis include:

- Liniaxis elaborata A. & H. Adams, 1863, a synonym of Coralliophila elaborata (H. Adams & A. Adams, 1863)
- Liniaxis elongata C. F. Laseron, 1955, this may be a synonym of, or a closely related species to the Mipus nodosus complex (A. Adams, 1854)
- Liniaxis sertata (Hedley, 1903), a synonym of Coralliophila sertata (Hedley, 1903)
