= Pocillopora inflata =

Conservation status
- Data Deficient (IUCN 3.1)

Scientific classification
- Kingdom: Animalia
- Phylum: Cnidaria
- Subphylum: Anthozoa
- Class: Hexacorallia
- Order: Scleractinia
- Family: Pocilloporidae
- Genus: Pocillopora
- Species: P. inflata

Binomial name
- Pocillopora inflata Glynn, 1999

Species of coral

Pocillopora inflata is a species of stony coral in the family Pocilloporidae. It was first described by Peter William Glynn in 1999. It is found growing on coral reefs in the tropical eastern Pacific Ocean but is nowhere abundant.

== Description ==
Pocillopora inflata is a colonial, zooxanthellate, arborescent coral. It varies in shape, sometimes forming knobbly mounds which can grow to 1 metre (3 ft 3 in) across, and sometimes having a more open structure with short branches several centimetres in diameter. The colour ranges from yellowish brown to shades of green. It can be distinguished from other members of the genus by the fact that it has swollen ends to the branches, a small number of pointed verrucae (or none at all) and prominent columellae on the lower part of the colony. The corallites are small and densely crowded and some of the septa, which are indistinct, are fused with the columella. The polyps have 12 tentacles.

== Distribution and habitat ==
Pocillopora inflata occurs in the tropical eastern Pacific Ocean from the coast of Mexico to Ecuador and the Galápagos Islands. It favours rocky shores and grows at depths of less than 10 metres (33 ft).

== Ecology ==
This species often grows among other Pocilloporid corals. Corals in the genus have relatively fast growth rates, with Pocillopora inflata growing at the rate of 2 to 4.4 centimetres (0.79 to 1.73 inches) a year. Most Pocilloporids brood their planula larvae, and this may also be true of Pocillopora inflata, but it has on one occasion been observed to broadcast eggs and sperm into the sea in a synchronised spawning event.

It has a number of predators. These include pufferfishes, parrotfishes and filefishes which feed on the branch tips and hermit crabs which scrape the skeletal tissue. Other predators feed on the soft tissues while leaving the skeleton intact. These include such fish as the butterflyfishes, the angelfishes and the damselfish, Stegastes acapulcoensis. Invertebrate predators include the crown-of-thorns starfish, the sea urchin, Eucidaris galapagensis, and the gastropods, Jenneria pustulata and Quoyula sp.

Pocillopora inflata has several mutualistic symbionts including the crab, Trapezia sp., and certain snapping shrimps which protect it from attack by its major predator, the crown-of-thorns starfish.

== Threats ==
Pocillopora inflata is an uncommon coral throughout its range and is more susceptible than many other species to bleaching and to predation by the crown-of-thorns starfish which is becoming more abundant in some areas. In common with other corals, it is threatened by rising sea temperatures, ocean acidification, ENSO events, severe storms, coral diseases, pollution and coral harvesting.
