= Emozamia licina =

Scientific classification
- Kingdom: Animalia
- Phylum: Mollusca
- Class: Gastropoda
- Subclass: Caenogastropoda
- Order: Neogastropoda
- Superfamily: Muricoidea
- Family: Muricidae
- Subfamily: Coralliophilinae
- Genus: Emozamia
- Species: E. licina

Binomial name
- Emozamia licina (Hedley & Petterd, 1906)

Synonyms
- Emozamia licinus [sic]; Murex licinus Hedley & Petterd, 1906; Trophon licinus (Hedley & Petterd, 1906)

Species of gastropod

Emozamia licina is a species of sea snail, a marine gastropod mollusk, in the family Muricidae, the murex snails or rock snails.

== Distribution ==
This species occurs in the following locations:

- Australian Exclusive Economic Zone
- Japanese Exclusive Economic Zone
- New Zealand Exclusive Economic Zone
