= Hirtomurex senticosus =

Scientific classification
- Kingdom: Animalia
- Phylum: Mollusca
- Class: Gastropoda
- Subclass: Caenogastropoda
- Order: Neogastropoda
- Superfamily: Muricoidea
- Family: Muricidae
- Subfamily: Coralliophilinae
- Genus: Hirtomurex
- Species: H. senticosus

Binomial name
- Hirtomurex senticosus (H. Adams & A. Adams, 1863)

Species of gastropod

Hirtomurex senticosus is a species of sea snail, a marine gastropod mollusk, in the family Muricidae, the murex snails or rock snails.
