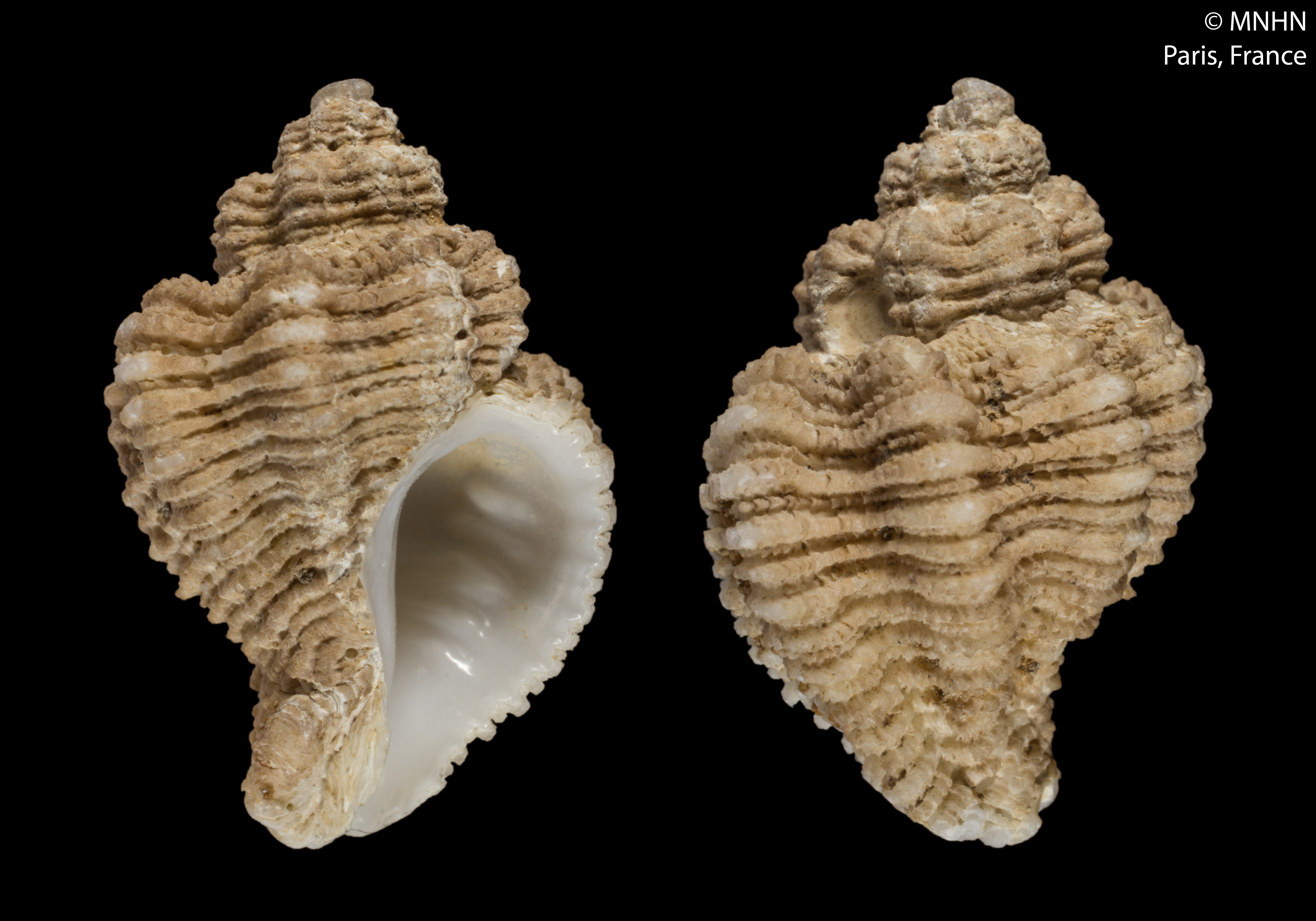
- Shell of Coralliophila nukuhiva (holotype at MNHN, Paris)

Scientific classification
- Kingdom: Animalia
- Phylum: Mollusca
- Class: Gastropoda
- Subclass: Caenogastropoda
- Order: Neogastropoda
- Family: Muricidae
- Genus: Coralliophila
- Species: C. nukuhiva

Binomial name
- Coralliophila nukuhiva Oliverio, 2008

= Coralliophila nukuhiva =

Species of gastropod

Coralliophila nukuhiva is a species of sea snail, a marine gastropod mollusc in the family Muricidae, the murex snails or rock snails.

== Description ==
C. nukuhiva attains a height of 20.8 mm, and a width of 15 mm.

The spire is high and conical, with deep sutures and angled shoulders. The inner lip is relatively straight and callous, and the outer lip is densely crenulated. The teleoconch sculpture consists of dense spiral cords forming minute imbricate spines, with broad axial varices.

C. nukuhiva resembles C. nivea and C. ovoidea, but differs in its more squat spire, denser spiral cords, and more prominent, angular shoulders.

== Distribution ==
This marine species occurs throughout the Marquesas Islands, where it has been collected alive at a depth of 220-416 m, and from the Grand Passage north of New Caledonia and the Norfolk Ridge, where it has been collected dead at a depth of 408-444 m.
