= Coralliophila porphyroleuca =

Scientific classification
- Kingdom: Animalia
- Phylum: Mollusca
- Class: Gastropoda
- Subclass: Caenogastropoda
- Order: Neogastropoda
- Superfamily: Muricoidea
- Family: Muricidae
- Subfamily: Coralliophilinae
- Genus: Coralliophila
- Species: C. porphyroleuca

Binomial name
- Coralliophila porphyroleuca (Crosse, 1870)

Synonyms
- Purpura porphyroleuca Crosse, 1870

Species of gastropod

Coralliophila porphyroleuca is a species of sea snail, a marine gastropod mollusk, in the family Muricidae, the murex snails or rock snails.

== Description ==
The shell attains a length of 21.6 mm.

== Distribution ==
This species occurs at the Tuamotu Islands and off Tahiti.
