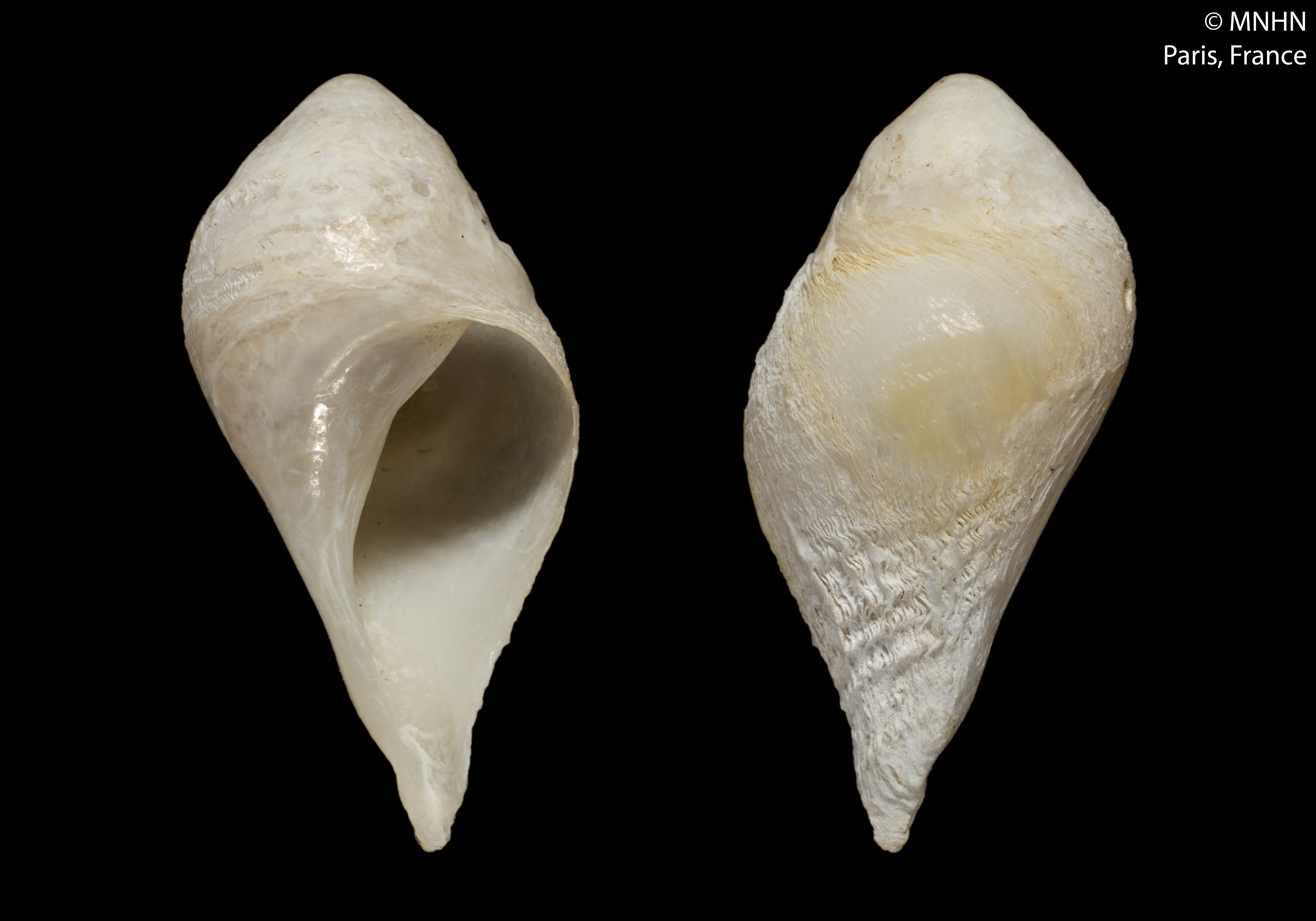

Scientific classification
- Kingdom: Animalia
- Phylum: Mollusca
- Class: Gastropoda
- Subclass: Caenogastropoda
- Order: Neogastropoda
- Superfamily: Muricoidea
- Family: Muricidae
- Subfamily: Coralliophilinae
- Genus: Leptoconchus
- Species: L. lamarckii

Binomial name
- Leptoconchus lamarckii Deshayes, 1863

Synonyms
- Leptoconchus lamarkii Deshayes, 1863 (incorrect original spelling); Magilus lamarckii (Deshayes, 1863)

= Leptoconchus lamarckii =

Species of gastropod

Leptoconchus lamarckii is a species of sea snail, a marine gastropod mollusk, in the family Muricidae, the murex snails or rock snails.

== Distribution ==
This marine species occurs off Réunion.
