= Mipus fusiformis =

Scientific classification
- Kingdom: Animalia
- Phylum: Mollusca
- Class: Gastropoda
- Subclass: Caenogastropoda
- Order: Neogastropoda
- Superfamily: Muricoidea
- Family: Muricidae
- Subfamily: Coralliophilinae
- Genus: Mipus
- Species: M. fusiformis

Binomial name
- Mipus fusiformis (Martens, 1902)

Synonyms
- Babelomurex fusiformis (Martens, 1902); Rapana fusiformis Martens, 1902

Species of gastropod

Mipus fusiformis is a species of sea snail, a marine gastropod mollusk, in the family Muricidae, the murex snails or rock snails.
