= Mipus rosaceus =

Scientific classification
- Kingdom: Animalia
- Phylum: Mollusca
- Class: Gastropoda
- Subclass: Caenogastropoda
- Order: Neogastropoda
- Superfamily: Muricoidea
- Family: Muricidae
- Subfamily: Coralliophilinae
- Genus: Mipus
- Species: M. rosaceus

Binomial name
- Mipus rosaceus (E. A. Smith, 1903)

Synonyms
- Coralliophila (Rhombothais) rosacea (E. A. Smith, 1903); Coralliophila rosacea (E. A. Smith, 1903); Latiaxis rosaceus E. A. Smith, 1903

Species of gastropod

Mipus rosaceus is a species of sea snail, a marine gastropod mollusk, in the family Muricidae, the murex snails or rock snails.
