= Mipus basicostatus =

Scientific classification
- Kingdom: Animalia
- Phylum: Mollusca
- Class: Gastropoda
- Subclass: Caenogastropoda
- Order: Neogastropoda
- Superfamily: Muricoidea
- Family: Muricidae
- Subfamily: Coralliophilinae
- Genus: Mipus
- Species: M. basicostatus

Binomial name
- Mipus basicostatus Kosuge, 1988

Species of gastropod

Mipus basicostatus is a species of sea snail, a marine gastropod mollusk, in the family Muricidae, the murex snails or rock snails.
