= Mipus matsumotoi =

Scientific classification
- Kingdom: Animalia
- Phylum: Mollusca
- Class: Gastropoda
- Subclass: Caenogastropoda
- Order: Neogastropoda
- Superfamily: Muricoidea
- Family: Muricidae
- Subfamily: Coralliophilinae
- Genus: Mipus
- Species: M. matsumotoi

Binomial name
- Mipus matsumotoi Kosuge, 1985

Species of gastropod

Mipus matsumotoi is a species of sea snail, a marine gastropod mollusk, in the family Muricidae, the murex snails or rock snails.

== Distribution ==
This species occurs in New Zealand Exclusive Economic Zone.
