= Hirtomurex filiaregis =

Scientific classification
- Kingdom: Animalia
- Phylum: Mollusca
- Class: Gastropoda
- Subclass: Caenogastropoda
- Order: Neogastropoda
- Superfamily: Muricoidea
- Family: Muricidae
- Subfamily: Coralliophilinae
- Genus: Hirtomurex
- Species: H. filiaregis

Binomial name
- Hirtomurex filiaregis (Kurohara, 1959)

Synonyms
- Latiaxis filiaregis Kurohara, 1959

Species of gastropod

Hirtomurex filiaregis is a species of sea snail, a marine gastropod mollusk, in the family Muricidae, the murex snails or rock snails.
