= Hirtomurex kawamurai =

Scientific classification
- Kingdom: Animalia
- Phylum: Mollusca
- Class: Gastropoda
- Subclass: Caenogastropoda
- Order: Neogastropoda
- Superfamily: Muricoidea
- Family: Muricidae
- Subfamily: Coralliophilinae
- Genus: Hirtomurex
- Species: H. kawamurai

Binomial name
- Hirtomurex kawamurai (Shikama, 1978)

Synonyms
- Coralliophila kawamurai Shikama, 1978

Species of gastropod

Hirtomurex kawamurai is a species of sea snail, a marine gastropod mollusk, in the family Muricidae, the murex snails or rock snails.
