= Mipus isosceles =

Scientific classification
- Kingdom: Animalia
- Phylum: Mollusca
- Class: Gastropoda
- Subclass: Caenogastropoda
- Order: Neogastropoda
- Superfamily: Muricoidea
- Family: Muricidae
- Subfamily: Coralliophilinae
- Genus: Mipus
- Species: M. isosceles

Binomial name
- Mipus isosceles (Barnard, 1959)

Synonyms
- Coralliophila isosceles Barnard, 1959

Species of gastropod

Mipus isosceles is a species of sea snail, a marine gastropod mollusk, in the family Muricidae, the murex snails or rock snails.
