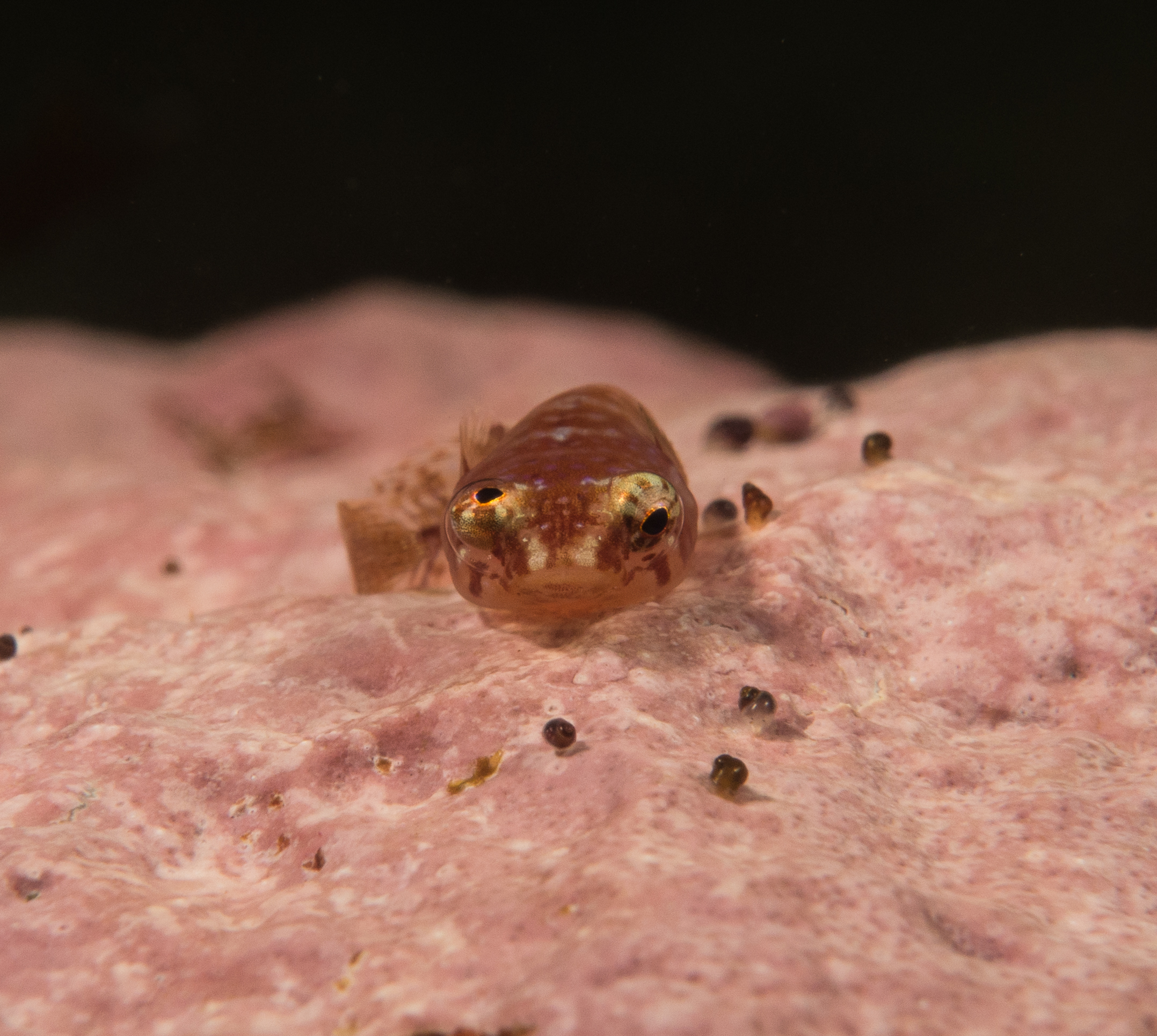
- Modicus minimus

Scientific classification
- Kingdom: Animalia
- Phylum: Chordata
- Class: Actinopterygii
- Order: Blenniiformes
- Family: Gobiesocidae
- Subfamily: Gobiesocinae
- Genus: Modicus; Hardy, 1983

Type species
- Modicus minimus Hardy, 1983

= Modicus (fish) =

Genus of fishes

Modicus is a genus of clingfishes endemic to the shores of New Zealand.

== Characteristics ==
The genus Modicus is distinguished from closely related genera by the possession of well-developed gill rakers; rays in the pectoral fin; and by having their teeth clustered at the front of either jaw, each jaw having up to two well-developed canines with the lower jaw having a single row of backward curving teeth. There are gill filaments on the first 3 gill arches and the gill membranes are fused medially with the isthmus. The sucker is a double disc formed by the fused pelvic fins.

== Species ==
There are currently two recognized species in this genus:

- Modicus minimus Hardy, 1983
- Modicus tangaroa Hardy, 1983
