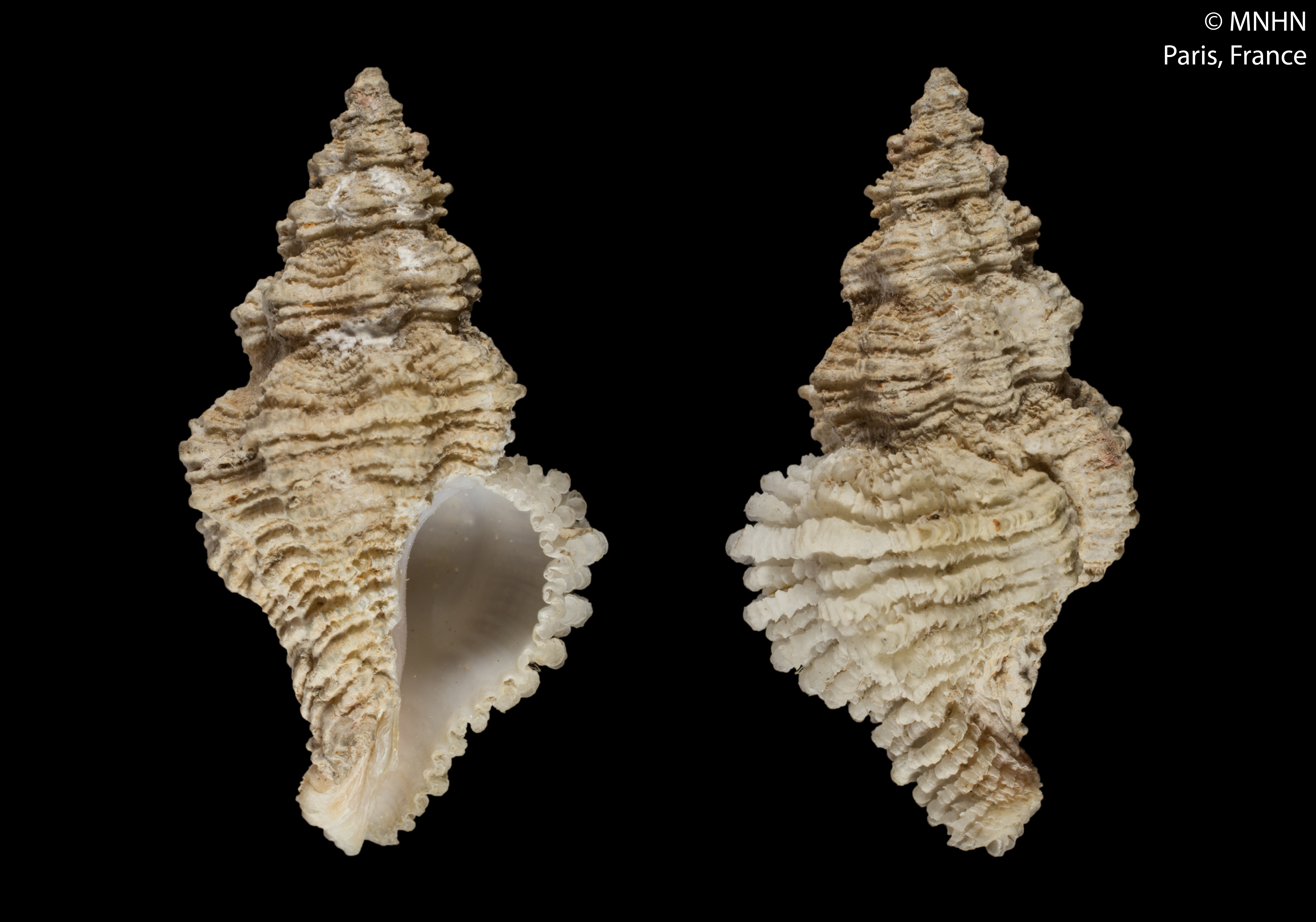
- Shell of Hirtomurex squamosus (neotype at MNHN, Paris)

Scientific classification
- Kingdom: Animalia
- Phylum: Mollusca
- Class: Gastropoda
- Subclass: Caenogastropoda
- Order: Neogastropoda
- Family: Muricidae
- Genus: Hirtomurex
- Species: H. squamosus

Binomial name
- Hirtomurex squamosus (Bivona Ant. in Bivona And., 1838)

Synonyms
- See "List of synonyms"

= Hirtomurex squamosus =

Species of gastropod

Hirtomurex squamosus is a species of sea snail, a marine gastropod mollusc in the family Muricidae, the murex snails or rock snails.

== List of synonyms ==
- Coralliophila alucoides (Blainville, 1829)
- Coralliophila alucoides curta Settepassi, 1977 (not available, published in a work which does not consistently use binomial nomenclature (ICZN art. 11.4))
- Coralliophila alucoides depressa Settepassi, 1977 (not available, published in a work which does not consistently use binomial nomenclature (ICZN art. 11.4))
- Coralliophila alucoides modesta Settepassi, 1977 (not available, published in a work which does not consistently use binomial nomenclature (ICZN art. 11.4))
- Coralliophila alucoides squamulata Settepassi, 1977 (not available, published in a work which does not consistently use binomial nomenclature (ICZN art. 11.4))
- Coralliophila lamellosa (Philippi, 1836)
- Coralliophila lamellosa elongata Settepassi, 1977 (not available, published in a work which does not consistently use binomial nomenclature (ICZN art. 11.4))
- Coralliophila lamellosa inflata Settepassi, 1977 (not available, published in a work which does not consistently use binomial nomenclature (ICZN art. 11.4))
- Coralliophila squamosa (Bivona Ant. in Bivona And., 1838)
- Coralliophila turris Settepassi, 1977 (not available, published in a work which does not consistently use binomial nomenclature (ICZN art. 11.4))
- Fusus craticulatus var. pianosana Sturany, 1896
- Fusus lamellosus Philippi, 1836 ex de Cristofori and Jan ms
- Fusus squamosus Bivona Ant. in Bivona And., 1838
- Fusus squamulosus Philippi, 1836
- Murex alucoides Blainville, 1829
- Ocinebrina ruderata pianosana Settepassi, 1977 (not available, published in a work which does not consistently use binomial nomenclature (ICZN art. 11.4))
- ? Pseudomurex monterosatoi Locard, 1897
- ? Pseudomurex perfectus Fischer P., 1883
- ? Pseudomurex ruderatus Sturany, 1896 ex Monterosato ms.

== Distribution ==
This species occurs in the North Atlantic Ocean, in the Mediterranean Sea off Greece and Corsica; in the Caribbean Sea and in the Gulf of Mexico.
