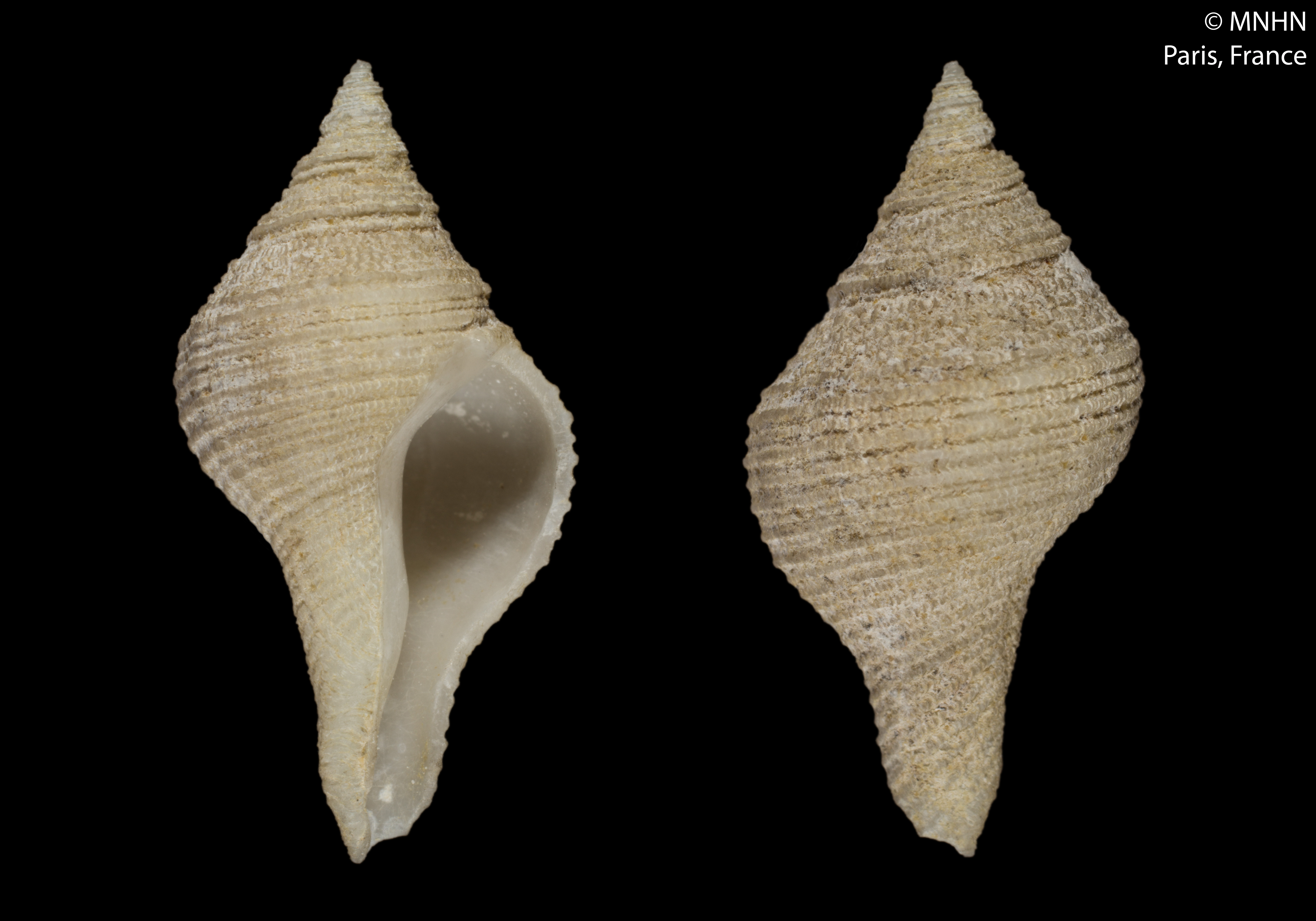
- Shell of Mipus coriolisi (holotype at MNHN, Paris)

Scientific classification
- Kingdom: Animalia
- Phylum: Mollusca
- Class: Gastropoda
- Subclass: Caenogastropoda
- Order: Neogastropoda
- Family: Muricidae
- Genus: Mipus
- Species: M. coriolisi

Binomial name
- Mipus coriolisi Kosuge & Oliverio, 2004

= Mipus coriolisi =

Species of gastropod

Mipus coriolisi is a species of sea snail, a marine gastropod mollusc in the family Muricidae, the murex snails or rock snails.

== Description ==
The length of the shell attains 22.7 mm.

== Distribution ==
This marine species occurs in the Coral Sea.
