= Mipus gyratus =

Scientific classification
- Kingdom: Animalia
- Phylum: Mollusca
- Class: Gastropoda
- Subclass: Caenogastropoda
- Order: Neogastropoda
- Family: Muricidae
- Genus: Mipus
- Species: M. gyratus

Binomial name
- Mipus gyratus (Hinds, 1844)

Species of gastropod

Mipus gyratus is a species of medium-sized to large sea snail, a marine gastropod mollusc in the family Muricidae, the murex snails or rock snails.
