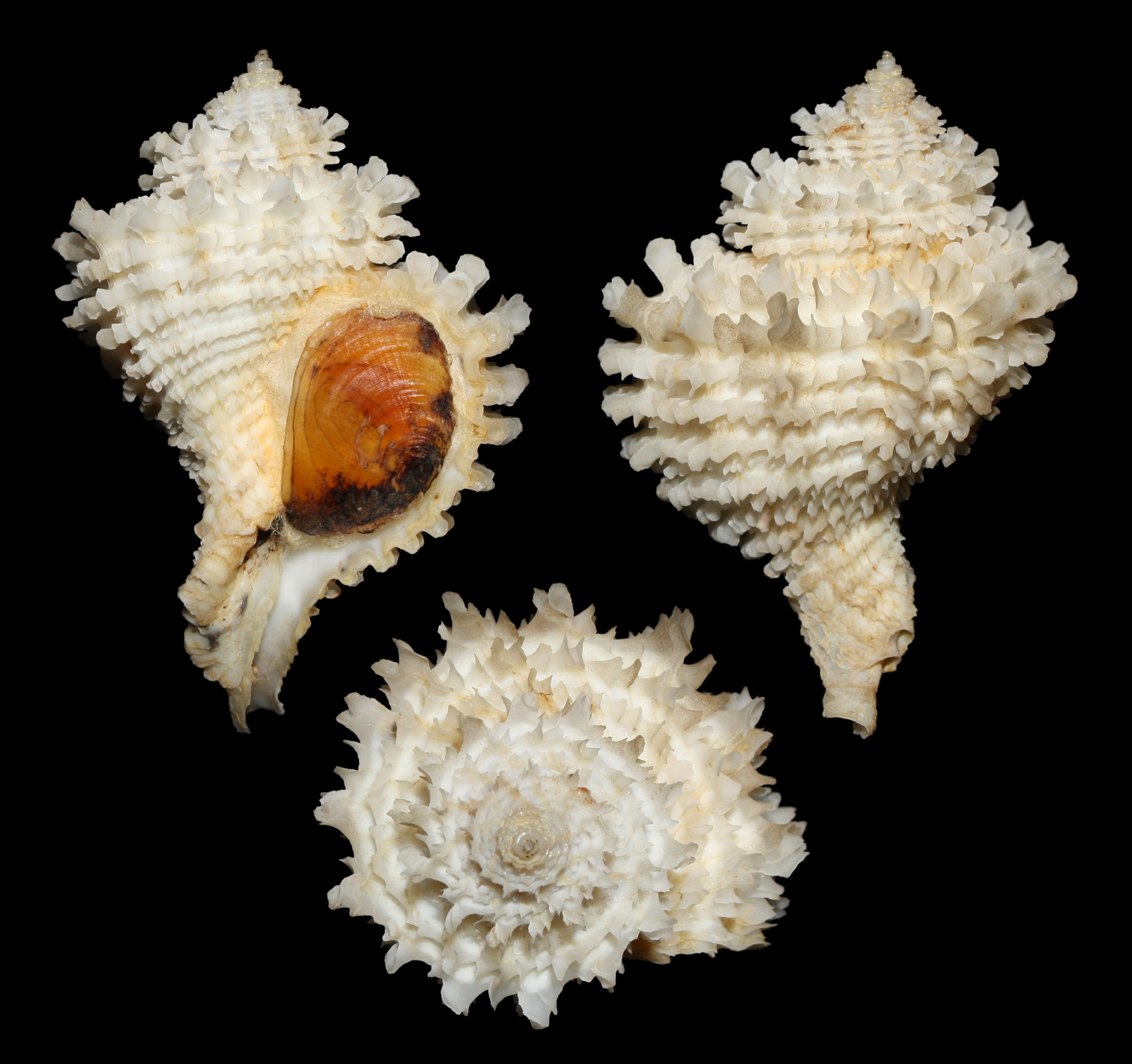
- Three views of a shell of Hirtomurex teramachii, with the operculum in place

Scientific classification
- Kingdom: Animalia
- Phylum: Mollusca
- Class: Gastropoda
- Subclass: Caenogastropoda
- Order: Neogastropoda
- Superfamily: Muricoidea
- Family: Muricidae
- Subfamily: Coralliophilinae
- Genus: Hirtomurex; Coen, 1922

Type species
- Fusus lamellosus Philippi, 1836

Synonyms
- Coralliophila (Hirtomurex) Coen, 1922; Pseudomurex (Hirtomurex) Coen, 1922 (original rank)

= Hirtomurex =

Genus of gastropods

Hirtomurex is a genus of sea snails, marine gastropod mollusks in the subfamily Coralliophilinae, the coral snails, within the family Muricidae, the murex snails and rock snails.

== Species ==
Species within the genus Hirtomurex include:

- Hirtomurex filiaregis (Kurohara, 1959)
- Hirtomurex guoi Lai & B.-S. Jung, 2016
- Hirtomurex isshikiensis (Shikama, 1971)
- Hirtomurex kawamurai (Shikama, 1978)
- Hirtomurex marshalli Oliverio, 2008
- Hirtomurex nakamurai Kosuge, 1985
- Hirtomurex oyamai Kosuge, 1985
- Hirtomurex scobina (Kilburn, 1973)
- Hirtomurex senticosus (H. Adams & A. Adams, 1863)
- Hirtomurex squamosus (Bivona Ant. in Bivona And., 1838)
- Hirtomurex tangaroa Marshall & Oliverio, 2009
- Hirtomurex taranui Marshall & Oliverio, 2009
- Hirtomurex teramachii (Kuroda, 1959)
- Hirtomurex winckworthi (Fulton, 1930)
