= Hirtomurex teramachii =

Scientific classification
- Kingdom: Animalia
- Phylum: Mollusca
- Class: Gastropoda
- Subclass: Caenogastropoda
- Order: Neogastropoda
- Family: Muricidae
- Genus: Hirtomurex
- Species: H. teramachii

Binomial name
- Hirtomurex teramachii (Kuroda, 1959)

Synonyms
- Latiaxis teramachii Kuroda, 1959

Species of gastropod

Hirtomurex teramachii is a species of sea snail, a marine gastropod mollusc, in the family Muricidae, the murex snails or rock snails.
