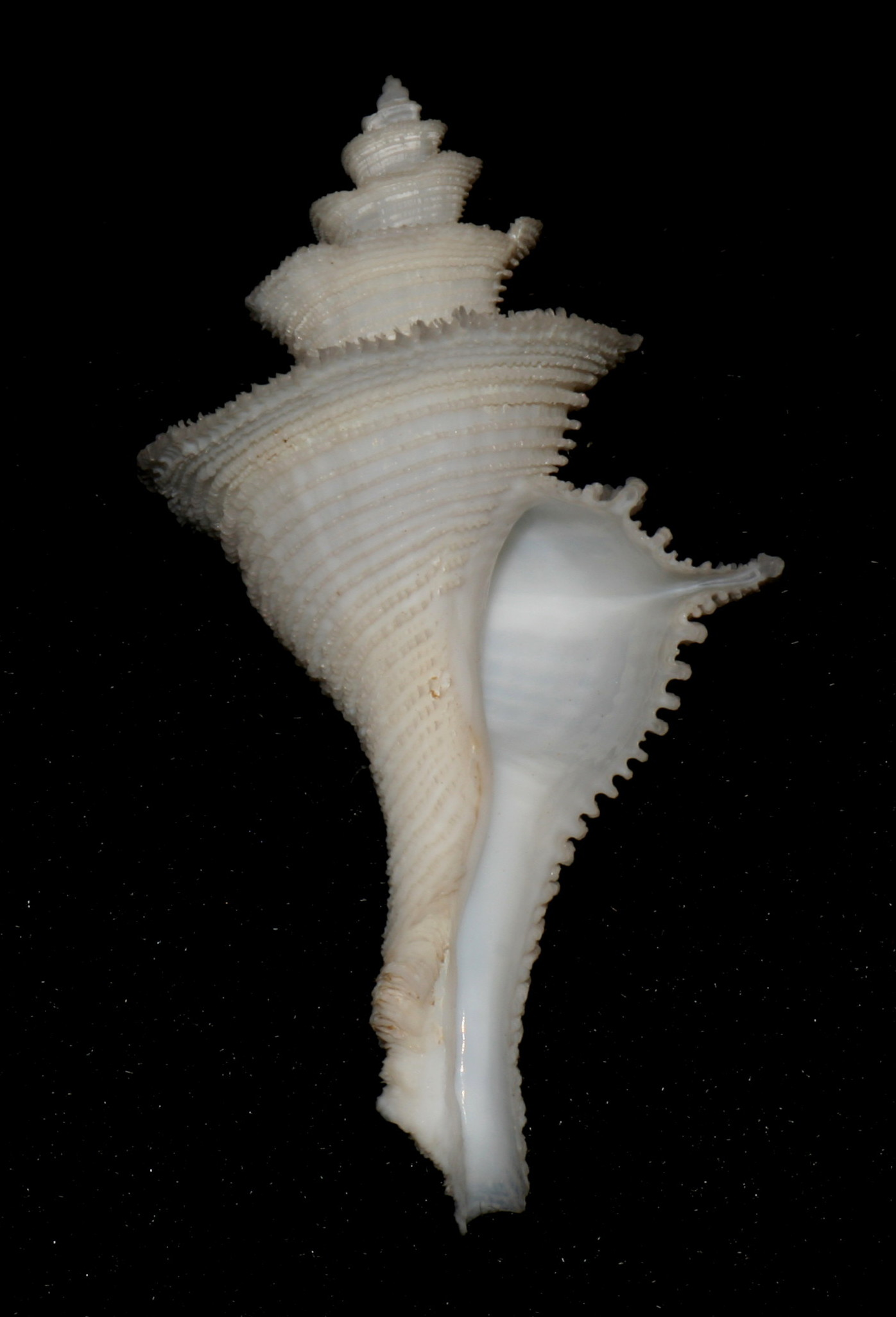
- Shell of Mipus vicdani (Kosuge, 1980), measuring 45.4 mm in length, trawled at 80 to 100 fathoms off Cebu Island, in the Philippines.

Scientific classification
- Kingdom: Animalia
- Phylum: Mollusca
- Class: Gastropoda
- Subclass: Caenogastropoda
- Order: Neogastropoda
- Family: Muricidae
- Genus: Mipus
- Species: M. vicdani

Binomial name
- Mipus vicdani (Kosuge, 1980)

Synonyms
- Latiaxis vicdani Kosuge, 1980 (basionym)

= Mipus vicdani =

Species of gastropod

Mipus vicdani is a species of sea snail, a marine gastropod mollusc in the family Muricidae, the murex snails or rock snails.
