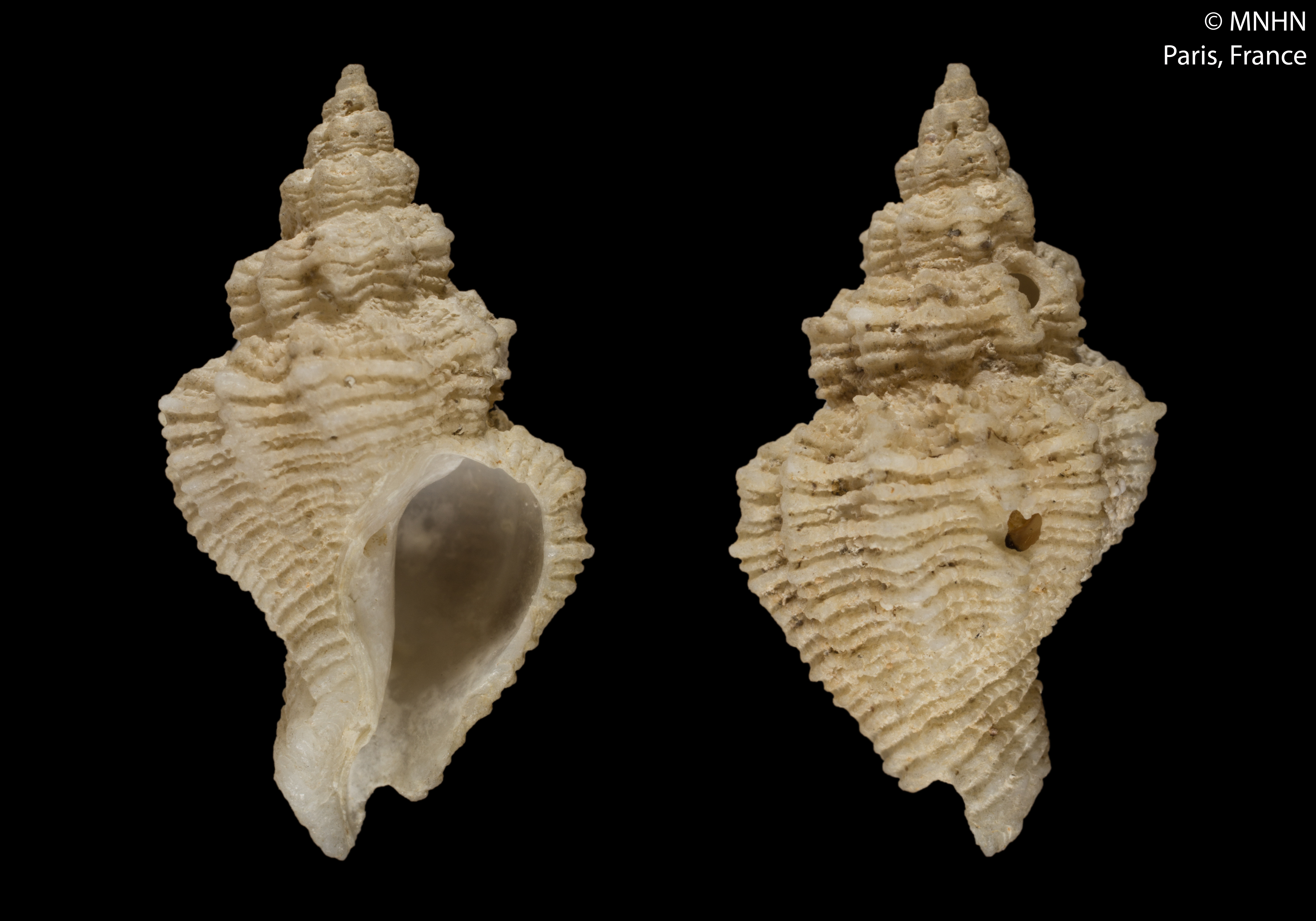
- Shell of Hirtomurex marshalli (holotype at MNHN, Paris)

Scientific classification
- Kingdom: Animalia
- Phylum: Mollusca
- Class: Gastropoda
- Subclass: Caenogastropoda
- Order: Neogastropoda
- Family: Muricidae
- Genus: Hirtomurex
- Species: H. marshalli

Binomial name
- Hirtomurex marshalli Oliverio, 2008

= Hirtomurex marshalli =

Species of gastropod

Hirtomurex marshalli is a species of sea snail, a marine gastropod mollusc in the family Muricidae, the murex snails or rock snails.

== Description ==
The length of the shell attains 22 mm.

== Distribution ==
This marine species occurs off New Caledonia at depths between 350 m and 575 m.
