= Coralliophila sertata =

Scientific classification
- Kingdom: Animalia
- Phylum: Mollusca
- Class: Gastropoda
- Subclass: Caenogastropoda
- Order: Neogastropoda
- Family: Muricidae
- Genus: Coralliophila
- Species: C. sertata

Binomial name
- Coralliophila sertata (Hedley, 1903)

Synonyms
- Liniaxis sertata Hedley, 1903 (basionym)

Species of gastropod

Coralliophila sertata is a species of medium-sized sea snail, a marine gastropod mollusk in the subfamily Coralliophilinae the coral snails, within the family Muricidae the rock snails. It is native to the Australian part of the Tasman Sea, and predates on sessile prey.
