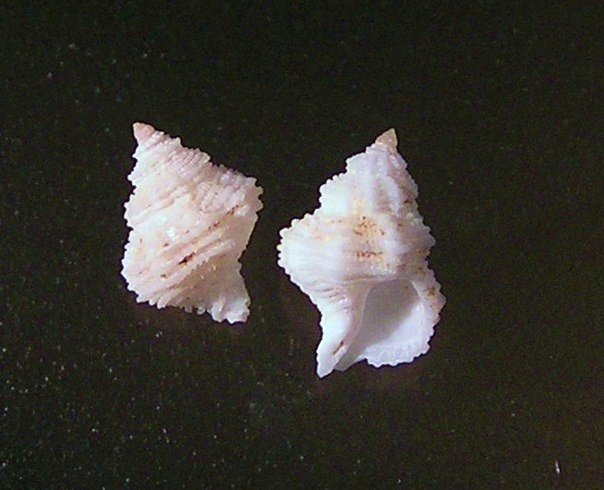
- Two shells of Mipus crebrilamellosus

Scientific classification
- Kingdom: Animalia
- Phylum: Mollusca
- Class: Gastropoda
- Subclass: Caenogastropoda
- Order: Neogastropoda
- Family: Muricidae
- Genus: Mipus
- Species: M. crebrilamellosus

Binomial name
- Mipus crebrilamellosus (Sowerby, G.B. III, 1913)

= Mipus crebrilamellosus =

Species of gastropod

Mipus crebrilamellosus is a species of sea snail, a marine gastropod mollusc in the subfamily Coralliophilinae, the coral snails, within the family Muricidae, the murex snails and rock snails.

== Description ==
The size of an adult shell varies between 15 mm and 25 mm.

== Distribution ==
This species occurs in the Pacific Ocean off Japan and off Southeast Asia.
