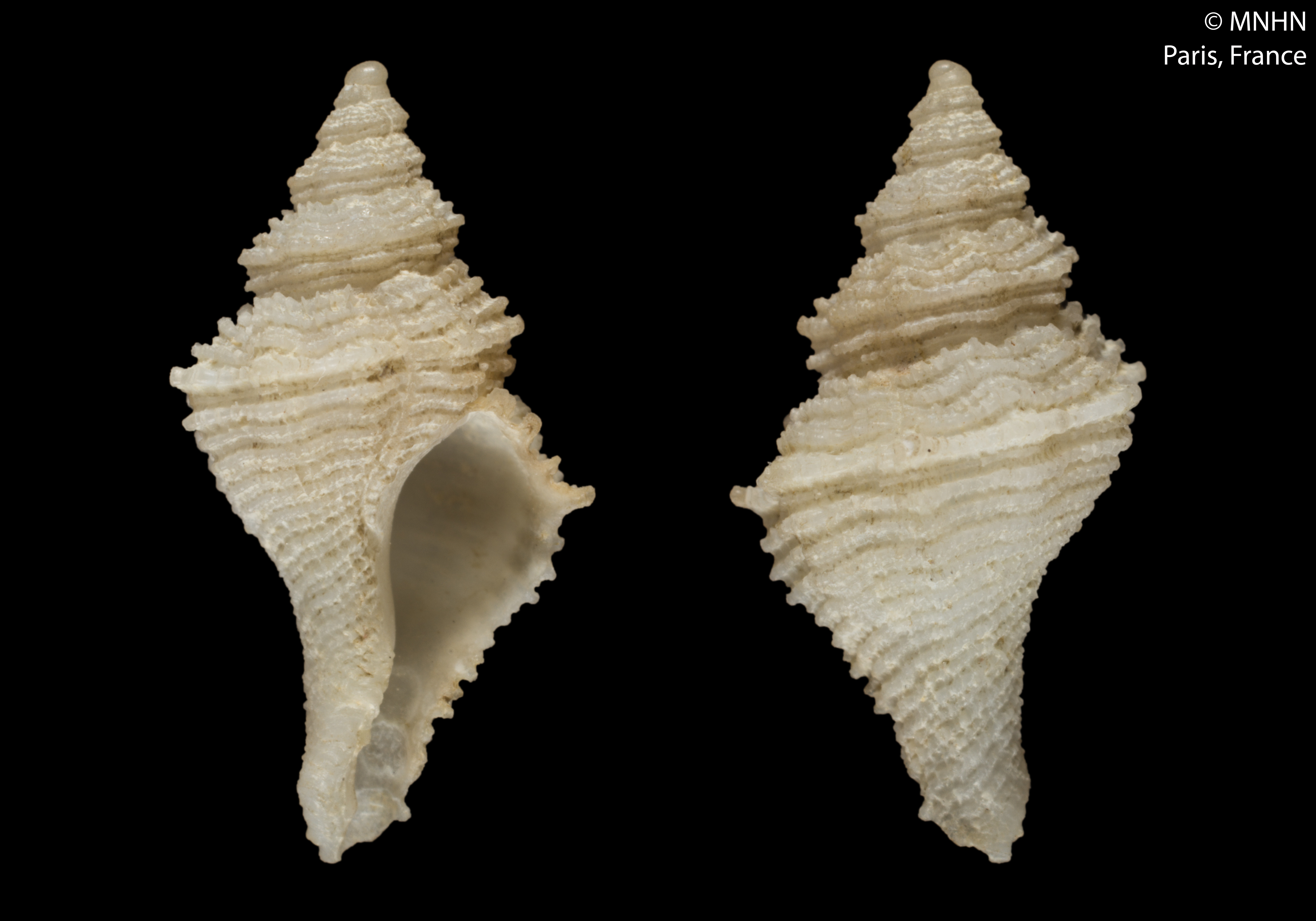
- Shell of Mipus tonganus (holotype at MNHN, Paris)

Scientific classification
- Kingdom: Animalia
- Phylum: Mollusca
- Class: Gastropoda
- Subclass: Caenogastropoda
- Order: Neogastropoda
- Family: Muricidae
- Genus: Mipus
- Species: M. tonganus

Binomial name
- Mipus tonganus Oliverio, 2008

= Mipus tonganus =

Species of gastropod

Mipus tonganus is a species of sea snail, a marine gastropod mollusc in the family Muricidae, the murex snails or rock snails.

The species was originally described by M. Oliverio.

== Description ==
The length of the shell attains 11.9 mm.

== Distribution ==
This marine species occurs off Tonga at depths between 281 m and 320 m.
