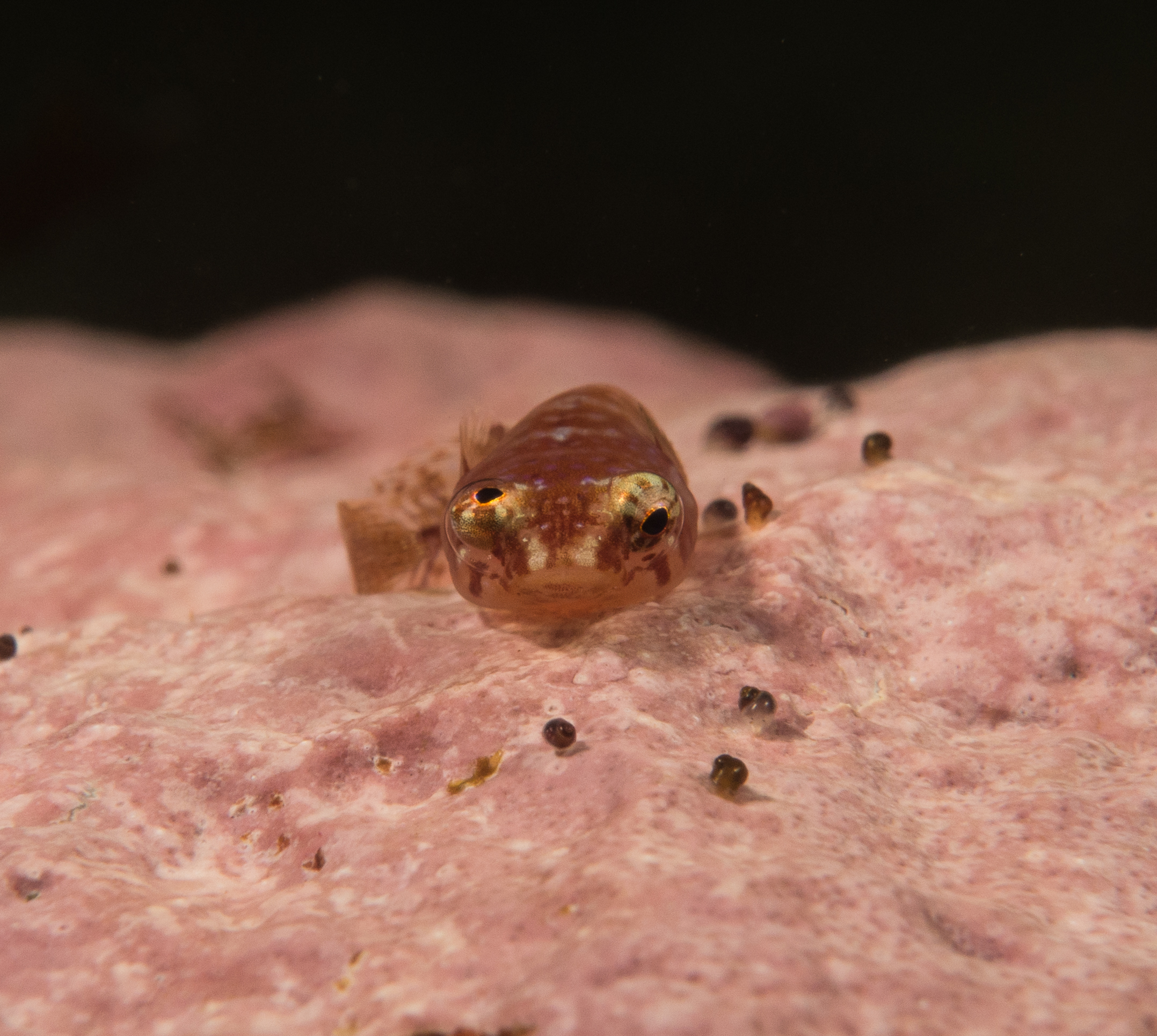

Scientific classification
- Kingdom: Animalia
- Phylum: Chordata
- Class: Actinopterygii
- Order: Blenniiformes
- Family: Gobiesocidae
- Genus: Modicus
- Species: M. minimus

Binomial name
- Modicus minimus Hardy, 1983

= Modicus minimus =

Species of fish

Modicus minimus is a clingfish of the family Gobiesocidae. It is found on coarse substrates consisting of mixed shell fragments and gravel and on beds of brachiopods. Graham S. Hardy described this species in 1983 with a type locality of the channel between southern Rangitoto Island and D'Urville Island, New Zealand collected at a depth 59–64 metres (194–210 ft).
