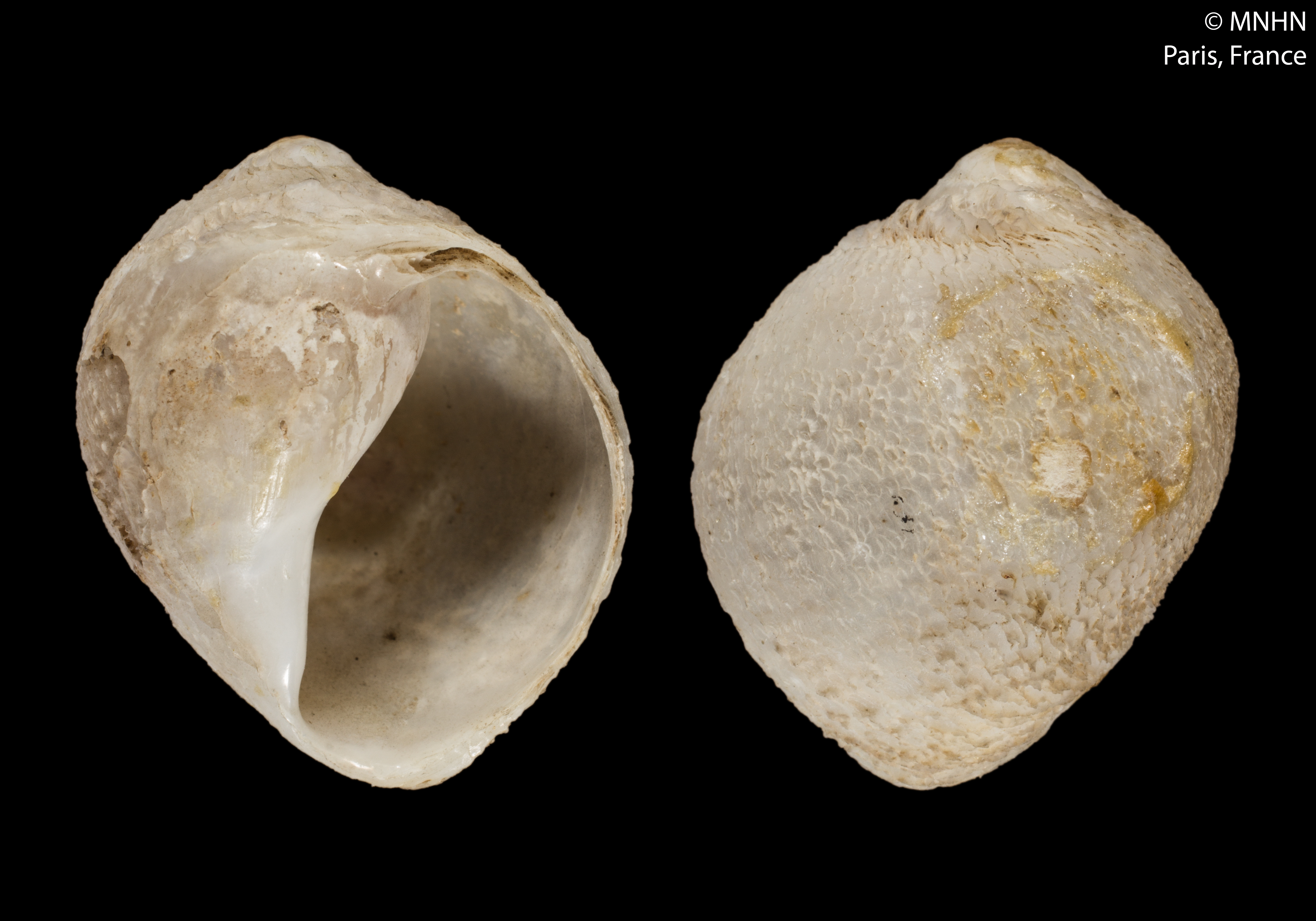
- Leptoconchus peronii (lectotype at MNHN, Paris)

Scientific classification
- Kingdom: Animalia
- Phylum: Mollusca
- Class: Gastropoda
- Subclass: Caenogastropoda
- Order: Neogastropoda
- Superfamily: Muricoidea
- Family: Muricidae
- Subfamily: Coralliophilinae
- Genus: Leptoconchus; Rüppell, 1835

Type species
- Leptoconchus striatus Rüppell, 1835

Synonyms
- Magilopsis G.B. Sowerby III, 1919

= Leptoconchus =

Genus of gastropods

Leptoconchus is a genus of medium-sized sea snails, marine gastropod mollusks in the family Muricidae, subfamily Coralliophilinae, the coral snails or coral shells.

== Description ==
The thin shell is globosely pyriform, with a perforate axis. The umbilicus is partly concealed by the reflected inner lip. The spire is obtuse. The aperture is oblong, produced anteriorly into a wide subrecurved siphonal canal.

The mantle-margin is greatly thickened and fleshy. The tentacles are small, broad, and united at their bases. The eyes are small and black, on the outer side of the tentacles, near their tips. The foot is small, short, obtuse and rounded behind, with a thin, expanded, disk-like lobe in front, and the siphon is obsolete.

There is no operculum.

== Species ==
The following species are currently accepted within Leptoconchus:

- † Leptoconchus costatus (Chenu, 1843)
- Leptoconchus cumingii MassDeshayes, 1863
- Leptoconchus cyphastrae Massin, 1983
- † Leptoconchus duvergieri (Cossmann & Peyrot, 1923)
- Leptoconchus ellipticus (G. B. Sowerby I, 1823)
- Leptoconchus expolitus (Shikama, 1963)
- Leptoconchus inactiniformis A. Gittenberger & E. Gittenberger, 2011
- Leptoconchus inalbechi A. Gittenberger & E. Gittenberger, 2011
- Leptoconchus incrassa A. Gittenberger & E. Gittenberger, 2011
- Leptoconchus incycloseris A. Gittenberger & E. Gittenberger, 2011
- Leptoconchus infungites A. Gittenberger & E. Gittenberger, 2011
- Leptoconchus ingrandifungi A. Gittenberger & E. Gittenberger, 2011
- Leptoconchus ingranulosa A. Gittenberger & E. Gittenberger, 2011
- Leptoconchus inlimax A. Gittenberger & E. Gittenberger, 2011
- Leptoconchus inpileus A. Gittenberger & E. Gittenberger, 2011
- Leptoconchus inpleuractis A. Gittenberger & E. Gittenberger, 2011
- Leptoconchus inscruposa A. Gittenberger & E. Gittenberger, 2011
- Leptoconchus inscutaria A. Gittenberger & E. Gittenberger, 2011
- † Leptoconchus intalpina A. Gittenberger & E. Gittenberger, 2011
- Leptoconchus jaegeri Rolle, 1863
- Leptoconchus lamarckii (Deshayes, 1863
- Leptoconchus massini A. Gittenberger & E. Gittenberger, 2011
- Leptoconchus peronii (Lamarck, 1818)
- Leptoconchus solidiusculus (G. B. Sowerby II, 1872)
- Leptoconchus vangoethemi Massin, 1983

Taxa inquirenda

- Leptoconchus cuvieri Deshayes, 1863
- Leptoconchus djedah (Chenu, 1843)
- Leptoconchus globulosus (G. B. Sowerby II, 1872)
- Leptoconchus maillardi Deshayes, 1863
- Leptoconchus noumeae Risbec, 1953
- Leptoconchus rostratus A. Adams, 1864
- Leptoconchus ruppelii Deshayes, 1863
- Leptoconchus serratus (G. B. Sowerby II, 1872)
- Leptoconchus tenuis (Chenu, 1843)

Species brought into synonymy include

- Leptoconchus fimbriatus (A. Adams, 1852): synonym of Coralliophila fimbriata (A. Adams, 1852)
- Leptoconchus lamarkii Deshayes, 1863: synonym of Leptoconchus lamarckii Deshayes, 1863 (incorrect original spelling)
- Leptoconchus robillardi Liénard, 1870: synonym of Coralliophila robillardi (Liénard, 1870)
- Leptoconchus schrenkii Lischke, 1871: synonym of Leptoconchus peronii (Lamarck, 1818)
- Leptoconchus striatus Rüppell, 1835: synonym of Leptoconchus peronii (Lamarck, 1818)
