= Rhizochilus antipathum =

Scientific classification
- Kingdom: Animalia
- Phylum: Mollusca
- Class: Gastropoda
- Subclass: Caenogastropoda
- Order: Neogastropoda
- Family: Muricidae
- Genus: Rhizochilus
- Species: R. antipathum

Binomial name
- Rhizochilus antipathum Steenstrup, 1850

Synonyms
- Rhizochilus teramachii Kuroda, 1953

Species of gastropod

Rhizochilus antipathum is a species of sea snail, a marine gastropod mollusk in the family Muricidae, the murex snails or rock snails.

== Description ==
The shell size varies between 14 mm and 20 mm.

== Distribution ==
This species is distributed in the Indian Ocean along South Africa and in the Indo-West Pacific.
