= Dusan Licina =

Serbian engineer and scientist

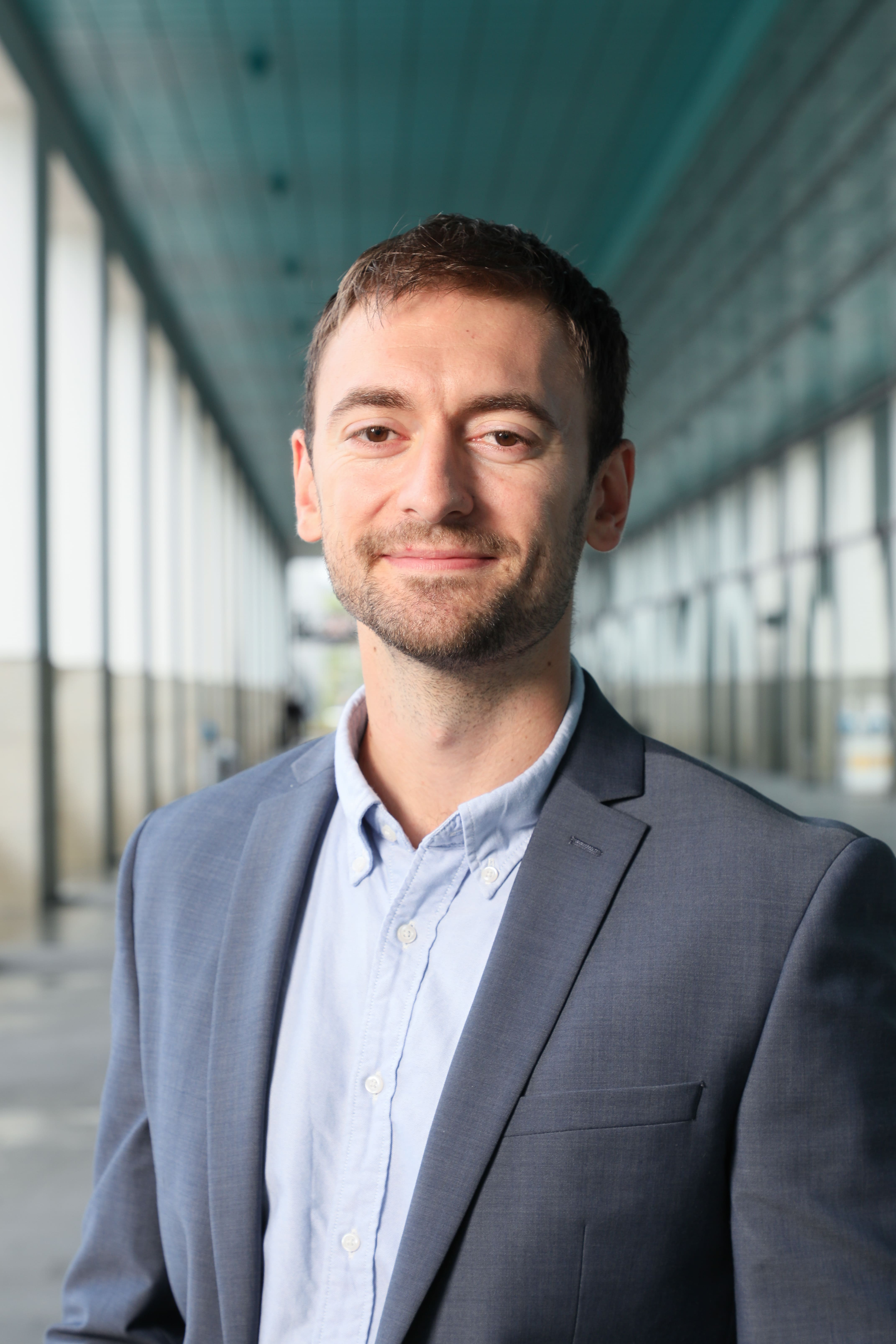
- Dusan Licina in 2018
- Born: Belgrade, Serbia
- Citizenship: Serbian
- Education: Mechanical engineering
- Alma mater: University of Belgrade (MSc); National University of Singapore & Technical University of Denmark (PhD)
- Awards: Ralph G. Nevins Physiology & Human Environment Award (2018); Yaglou Award (2022); ISIAQ Academy Fellow (2026)
- Scientific career
- Fields: Indoor environmental quality; indoor air and exposure science; building ventilation and environmental control
- Workplaces: École Polytechnique Fédérale de Lausanne (EPFL)
- Thesis: Human convective boundary layer and its impact on personal exposure (2015)
- Doctoral advisor: Tham Kwok Wai, Chandra Sekhar, Arsen Krikor Melikov
- Other academic advisors: William W. Nazaroff
- Website: https://www.epfl.ch/labs/hobel/

Dusan Licina (born in 1986 in Belgrade, Serbia) is a Serbian engineer and researcher. He is an Associate Professor at EPFL (École Polytechnique Fédérale de Lausanne) and Director of the Human-Oriented Built Environment Laboratory at EPFL Fribourg. His research spans fundamental indoor air and exposure science, ventilation, sensing and environmental control, and performance-based assessment of healthy, lower-carbon buildings.

== Early life and education ==
Licina received a B.Sc. in 2008 and a M.Sc. in 2010 in Mechanical Engineering from the University of Belgrade. During this time, he specialized in heating, ventilation, and air-Conditioning (HVAC) systems. In 2015, he received a joint Ph.D. from the National University of Singapore (School of Design and Environment) and the Technical University of Denmark (International Centre for Indoor Environment and Energy).

His doctoral thesis "Human convective boundary layer and its impact on personal exposure" examined airflow around the human body and its interactions with room ventilation, with particular emphasis on personal exposure to airborne pollutants.

== Career ==
Upon completing his Ph.D., Licina moved to the University of California, Berkeley as a postdoctoral researcher in the group of William W. Nazaroff. His postdoctoral research examined indoor pollutant sources and transport and their implications for human inhalation exposure. He subsequently served as Director of Standard Development at the International WELL Building Institute (IWBI) in New York, where he contributed to the development of the air-quality and thermal-environment concepts to the WELL Building Standard (v2).

Licina joined EPFL in June 2018 as a tenure-track assistant professor of Indoor Environmental Quality at the School of Architecture, Civil, and Environmental Engineering (ENAC), where he established and has since directed the Human-Oriented Built Environment Laboratory (HOBEL) at EPFL, also part of the Smart Living Lab in Fribourg.

In 2025, Licina was promoted to Associate Professor of Civil Engineering at EPFL.

== Research ==
Licina's research connects fundamental indoor air science with building operation and performance. His work examines how indoor pollutants are generated, transformed, transported and inhaled; how ventilation, sensing and control strategies influence exposure and indoor environmental quality; and how building performance can be evaluated in relation to health, energy use and carbon impacts. His research combines laboratory and environmental-chamber experiments, field measurements, environmental sensing, modeling, data analysis and simulation.

Indoor pollutants and exposure

A major area of Licina's research concerns the sources, physical and chemical transformations, transport and inhalation of pollutants in indoor environments. His earlier studies investigated the human “personal cloud,” the release of particles from the vicinity of occupants, and clothing-mediated exposure to particles and chemicals. Subsequent research has expanded this work toward human-associated emissions, indoor chemistry and ultrafine-particle formation.

In a 2024 chamber study, Licina and collaborators examined volatile organic compounds emitted by fragranced personal-care products and their reactions with indoor ozone. More than 200 volatile organic compounds were detected from the products tested, while ozone-initiated chemistry resulted in the formation of oxidized vapors and ultrafine particles.

His research has also examined biological and human-associated sources of indoor pollutants. A 2026 study led by HOBEL characterized chemical, particulate and microbial emissions associated with dogs indoors and examined their interaction with ozone, including the formation of nanocluster aerosols and oxidized volatile organic compounds.

Ventilation, sensing and environmental control

A second strand of Licina's research concerns building ventilation, air filtration, environmental sensing and control strategies. This work investigates how buildings can use ventilation and air-cleaning systems to reduce pollutant exposure while limiting associated energy demand.

Research from his group has examined the health and energy implications of residential ventilation systems under different European climatic and outdoor-air-quality conditions. A 2024 study comparing ventilation strategies found that outdoor-air filtration could reduce health-related particulate exposure while appropriately designed ventilative cooling could lower energy demand without compromising the modeled health outcomes.

His group has also conducted field studies of ventilation and indoor air quality in schools. A 2025 study of 24 Swiss primary schools reported generally low pollutant concentrations and found that mechanically ventilated classrooms had approximately 20–30% lower carbon dioxide and total volatile organic compound levels than naturally ventilated classrooms.

Indoor environmental quality and building performance

Licina's more recent work extends from individual pollutants and ventilation systems to building-scale assessment of indoor environmental quality (IEQ). This research includes continuous environmental sensing, performance-based assessment, benchmarking, building renovation and methods for jointly evaluating indoor conditions and building performance.

In 2026, HOBEL researchers developed ATLAS (Air quality, Thermal comfort, Lighting, and Acoustics Scale), a performance-based framework for continuous and integrated IEQ assessment. The index combines measurements across multiple IEQ domains and incorporates occupant priorities through adaptive weighting; it was demonstrated using 18+ months of measurements from occupied residential buildings.

== Recognition ==
In 2022, Licina received the Yaglou Award granted by the International Society of Indoor Air Quality and Climate (ISIAQ) at the Indoor Air 2022 conference. The award recognized his research on sustainable and healthy buildings, particularly work concerning pollutant dynamics, occupant exposure, ventilation and environmental controls.

Licina received the Ralph G. Nevins Physiology and Human Environment Award in 2018 from the American Society of Heating, Refrigerating and Air-Conditioning Engineers (ASHRAE).

In 2026, Licina was elected a Fellow of the ISIAQ Academy, an honor recognizing contributions to research, practice or service in the indoor air sciences.

Licina was elected Treasurer-Elect of ISIAQ in 2024 and subsequently became Treasurer and a member of its Board of Directors.

He serves on the Editorial Board of Indoor Environments, the journal of ISIAQ.

== Selected works ==
- Yang, Shen; Wang, Nijing; Arnoldi-Meadows, Tatjana; Bekö, Gabriel; Zhang, Meixia; Merizak, Marouane; Wargocki, Pawel; Williams, Jonathan; Täubel, Martin; Licina, Dusan (2026). “Our Best Friends: How Dogs Alter Indoor Air Quality.” Environmental Science & Technology. 60 (8): 6404–6414. doi:10.1021/acs.est.5c13324.
- Du, Bowen; Crosby, Sarah; van Rooyen, C. A.; Licina, Dusan (2026). “ATLAS: A performance-based index for integrated evaluation and benchmarking of indoor environmental quality.” Building and Environment. 304: 114985. doi:10.1016/j.buildenv.2026.114985.
- Du, Bowen; Rey, Joan F.; Cesari, Matias; et al.; Licina, Dusan (2025). “Indoor air quality in Swiss primary schools: impacts of mechanical ventilation and seasonal variation.” Building and Environment. 280: 113146. doi:10.1016/j.buildenv.2025.113146.
- Wu, Tianren; Müller, Tatjana; Wang, Nijing; Byron, Joseph; Langer, Sarka; Williams, Jonathan; Licina, Dusan (2024). “Indoor Emission, Oxidation, and New Particle Formation of Personal Care Product Related Volatile Organic Compounds.” Environmental Science & Technology Letters. 11 (10): 1053–1061. doi:10.1021/acs.estlett.4c00353.
- Belias, Evangelos; Licina, Dusan (2024). “European residential ventilation: Investigating the impact on health and energy demand.” Energy and Buildings. 304: 113839. doi:10.1016/j.enbuild.2023.113839.
- Demanega, Ingrid; Mujan, Igor; Singer, Brett C.; Anđelković, Aleksandar S.; Babich, Francesco; Licina, Dusan (2021). "Performance assessment of low-cost environmental monitors and single sensors under variable indoor air quality and thermal conditions". Building and Environment. 187 107415. Bibcode:2021BuEnv.18707415D. doi:10.1016/j.buildenv.2020.107415. S2CID 228917368.
- Licina, Dusan; Morrison, Glenn C.; Bekö, Gabriel; Weschler, Charles J.; Nazaroff, William W. (2019). "Clothing-Mediated Exposures to Chemicals and Particles" (PDF). Environmental Science & Technology. 53 (10): 5559–5575. Bibcode:2019EnST...53.5559L. doi:10.1021/acs.est.9b00272. PMID 31034216. S2CID 140518813.
- Licina, D.; Tian, Y.; Nazaroff, W. W. (2017). "Emission rates and the personal cloud effect associated with particle release from the perihuman environment". Indoor Air. 27 (4): 791–802. Bibcode:2017InAir..27..791L. doi:10.1111/ina.12365. PMID 28009455. S2CID 21684324.
- Licina, D.; Melikov, A.; Sekhar, C.; Tham, K. W. (2015). "Human convective boundary layer and its interaction with room ventilation flow". Indoor Air. 25 (1): 21–35. Bibcode:2015InAir..25...21L. doi:10.1111/ina.12120. PMID 24750235. S2CID 12354622.
