= Emozamia =

Scientific classification
- Kingdom: Animalia
- Phylum: Mollusca
- Class: Gastropoda
- Subclass: Caenogastropoda
- Order: Neogastropoda
- Family: Muricidae
- Subfamily: Coralliophilinae
- Genus: Emozamia; Iredale, 1929

Genus of gastropods

Emozamia is a genus of sea snails, marine gastropod mollusks in the subfamily Coralliophilinae, the coral snails, within the family Muricidae, the murex snails and rock snails.

== Species ==
Species within the genus Emozamia include:

- Emozamia licinus
