= Hirtomurex tangaroa =

Scientific classification
- Kingdom: Animalia
- Phylum: Mollusca
- Class: Gastropoda
- Subclass: Caenogastropoda
- Order: Neogastropoda
- Family: Muricidae
- Genus: Hirtomurex
- Species: H. tangaroa

Binomial name
- Hirtomurex tangaroa Marshall & Oliverio, 2009

Species of gastropod

Hirtomurex tangaroa is a species of sea snail, a marine gastropod mollusc in the family Muricidae, the murex snails or rock snails.
