= Modicus tangaroa =

Scientific classification
- Kingdom: Animalia
- Phylum: Chordata
- Class: Actinopterygii
- Order: Blenniiformes
- Family: Gobiesocidae
- Genus: Modicus
- Species: M. tangaroa

Binomial name
- Modicus tangaroa Hardy, 1983

Species of fish

Modicus tangaroa is a clingfish of the family Gobiesocidae, found only around New Zealand where it occurs on coarse substrates consisting of shell fragments and bryozoa at depths of 20–149 metres (66–489 ft). This species was described by Grahma S Hardy in 1983 from types collected from the research vessel Tangoroa over the Ranfurly Bank, East Cape in New Zealand, the species was named after the vessel.
