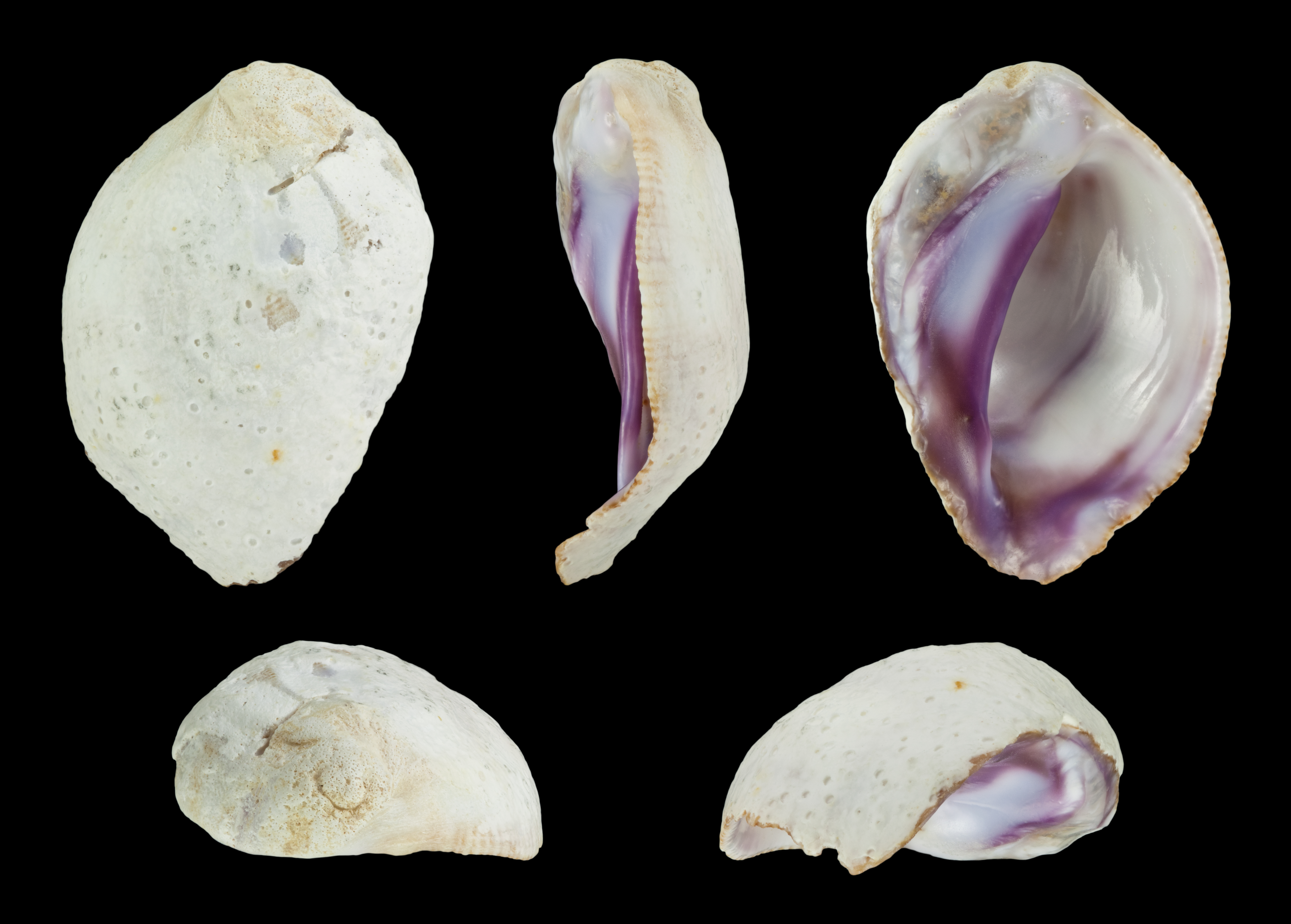

Scientific classification
- Kingdom: Animalia
- Phylum: Mollusca
- Class: Gastropoda
- Subclass: Caenogastropoda
- Order: Neogastropoda
- Family: Muricidae
- Genus: Coralliophila
- Species: C. monodonta

Binomial name
- Coralliophila monodonta (Blainville, 1832)

Synonyms
- Coralliophila madreporara [sic] (misspelling); Coralliophila madreporarum (G. B. Sowerby I, 1834); Galeropsis madreporarum Sowerby, G.B. I, 1834; Galeropsis monodontus (Blainville, H.M.D. de, 1832); Purpura madreporarum G.B. Sowerby I [in J. Sowerby & G.B. Sowerby I], 1834; Purpura monodonta Blainville, 1832 (basionym); Quoyula madreporarum (Sowerby I, 1832); Quoyula monodonta (Blainville, 1832); Rhizochilus madreporarum Sowerby

= Coralliophila monodonta =

Species of gastropod

Coralliophilla monodonta is a species of sea snail, a marine gastropod mollusk in the family Muricidae, the murex snails or rock snails.

== Description ==
The shell size varies between 16 mm and 35 mm. The outside of the shell is an off-white color and the inside has a deep purple color.

== Distribution ==
Coralliophilla monodonta can be found naturally in Mozambique, New Zealand, Natal and the Marquesas Islands and was introduced as an alien into the Italian part of the Adriatic Sea. They can also be found in the Eastern Basin of the Mediterranean sea.
