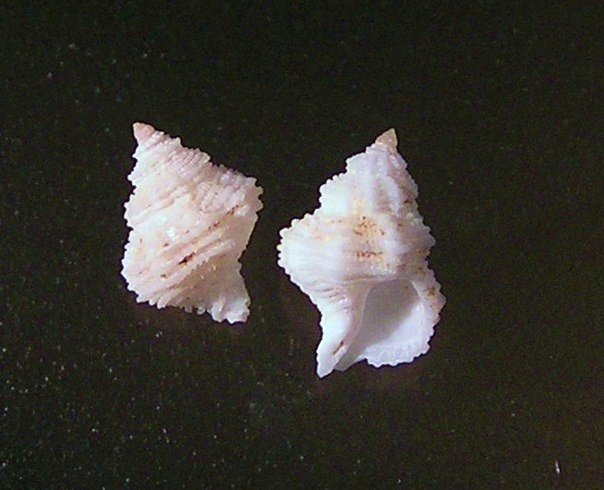
- Two shells of Mipus crebrilamellosus

Scientific classification
- Kingdom: Animalia
- Phylum: Mollusca
- Class: Gastropoda
- Subclass: Caenogastropoda
- Order: Neogastropoda
- Family: Muricidae
- Subfamily: Coralliophilinae; Chenu, 1858

Genera
- See text

Synonyms
- Coralliophilidae Chenu, 1859 (currently considered a subfamily of the Muricidae); Magilidae Thiele, 1925; Rapidae Kuroda, 1941

= Coralliophilinae =

Coralliophilinae Temporal range: Cretaceous to Recent

Subfamily of gastropods

Coralliophilinae is a taxonomic group, a subfamily of about 200–250 sea snails, marine gastropod mollusks commonly known as the coral snails or coral shells. This is a subfamily within the very large family Muricidae, the murex or rock snails.

According to the taxonomy of the Gastropoda (Bouchet & Rocroi, 2005), this group is considered to be a subfamily, the Coralliophilinae, of the family Muricidae. Prior to the taxonomy of the Gastropoda (Bouchet & Rocroi, 2005), the Coralliophilinae was recognized as a distinct family the Coralliophilidae. The subfamily Coralliophilinae is monophyletic, as confirmed by genetic research with molecular markers.

== Distribution and habitat ==
The coral snails are coral dwellers that occur worldwide in temperate and tropical seas. They can be found in very diverse places such as the mid-Atlantic seamounts, the Canary Islands, the deep water coral banks in the Mediterranean, from the Florida Keys to Brazil, the Indo-Pacific Region, the southwest Pacific, the Austral Islands (South Pacific). Such a dispersal of the subfamily can be attributed to oceanic currents and planktotrophic larval development.

These snails are specialist feeders, feeding exclusively on anthozoans by boring into them. A few live between soft corals and anemones and use their long and extensible proboscis to ingest the soft tissue. Some feed on sea fans.

== Genera ==
Genera within the subfamily Coralliophilinae include:

- Babelomurex Coen, 1922
- Coralliophila H. Adams & A. Adams, 1853
- Emozamia Iredale, 1929
- Hirtomurex Coen, 1922
- Latiaxis Swainson, 1840
- Leptoconchus Rüppell, 1834
- Liniaxis Laseron, 1955
- Magilus Montfort, 1810
- Mipus de Gregorio, 1885
- Rapa Röding, 1798
- Rhizochilus Steenstrup, 1850

Genera brought into synonymy

- Aradasia Settepassi, 1970 = synonym of Coralliophila H. Adams & A. Adams, 1853
- Aradomurex Coen, 1947 = synonym of Coralliophila H. Adams & A. Adams, 1853
- Coralliobia H. Adams & A. Adams, 1853 = synonym of Coralliophila H. Adams & A. Adams, 1853
- Echinolatiaxis Kosuge, 1979 = synonym of Babelomurex Coen, 1922
- Fusomurex Coen, 1922 = synonym of Coralliophila H. Adams & A. Adams, 1853
- Laevilatiaxis Kosuge, 1979 = synonym of Babelomurex Coen, 1922
- Lamellatiaxis Habe & Kosuge, 1970 = synonym of Babelomurex Coen, 1922
- Langfordia Dall, 1924 = synonym of Babelomurex Coen, 1922
- Latimurex : synonym of Latiromurex Coen, 1922
- Latiromurex Coen, 1922 = synonym of Coralliophila H. Adams & A. Adams, 1853
- Lepadomurex Coen, 1922 = synonym of Coralliophila H. Adams & A. Adams, 1853
- Magilopsis G.B. Sowerby III, 1919 = synonym of Leptoconchus Rüppell, 1834
- Pseudomurex Monterosato, 1872 = synonym of Coralliophila H. Adams & A. Adams, 1853
- Quoyula Iredale, 1912 = synonym of Coralliophila H. Adams & A. Adams, 1853
- Rapella Swainson, 1840 = synonym of Rapa Röding, 1798
- Reliquiaecava Massin, 1987 = synonym of Coralliophila H. Adams & A. Adams, 1853
- Rhombothais Woolacott, 1954 = synonym of Coralliophila H. Adams & A. Adams, 1853
- Tarantellaxis Habe, 1970 = synonym of Babelomurex Coen, 1922
- Tolema Iredale, 1929 = synonym of Babelomurex Coen, 1922

Within this subfamily, the systematics at species level is problematic as many adult species show broad intraspecific morphologic variability that also depends on the substrate they live. The morphology of the protoconch is usually very helpful as a taxonomic character.
