= Rapana (disambiguation) =

Rapana may refer to:

== Animals ==
- Rapana, a genus of predatory sea snail
  - Rapana bezoar
  - Rapana bulbosa
  - Rapana rapiformis
  - Rapana pellucida
  - Rapana venosa

== People ==
- Ihakara Te Tuku Rapana (1886–1968), a New Zealand champion sheep shearer and wrestler
- Jordan Rapana (b 1989), a New Zealand rugby league player

== Ships ==
- MV Rapana, a British tanker that served from 1935 to 1950, converted to a merchant aircraft carrier during World War II
