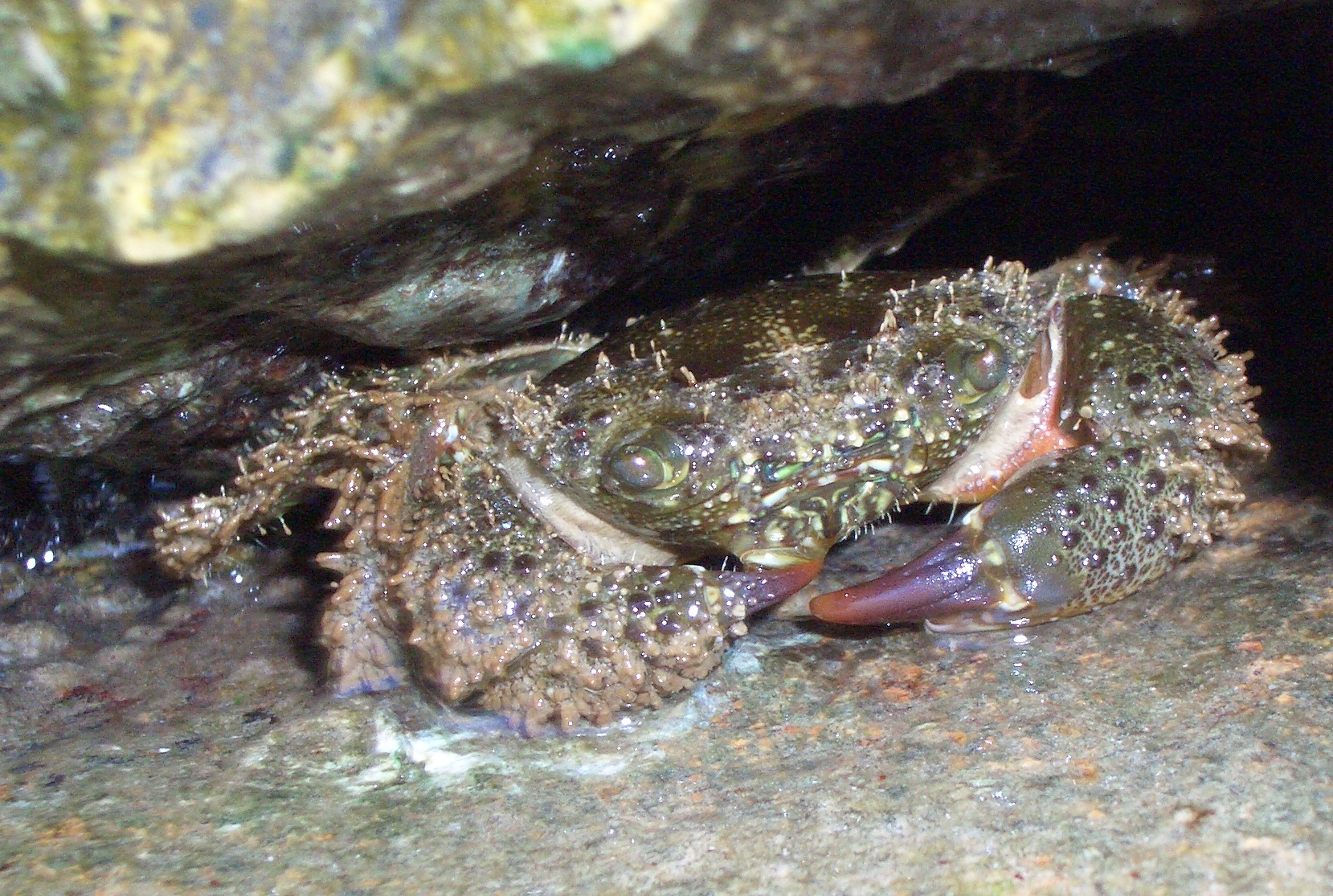
- Eriphia verrucosa

Scientific classification
- Kingdom: Animalia
- Phylum: Arthropoda
- Clade: Pancrustacea
- Class: Malacostraca
- Order: Decapoda
- Suborder: Pleocyemata
- Infraorder: Brachyura
- Section: Eubrachyura
- Subsection: Heterotremata
- Superfamily: Eriphioidea
- Family: Eriphiidae; MacLeay, 1838

= Eriphiidae =

Family of crabs

Eriphiidae is a family of crabs, now comprising two genera:

- Eriphia Latreille, 1817
- Eriphides Rathbun, 1897

Genera Globopilumnus (=Eupilumnus) and Eudora (=Lydia) are no longer recognized and have been reassigned to family Oziidae.
