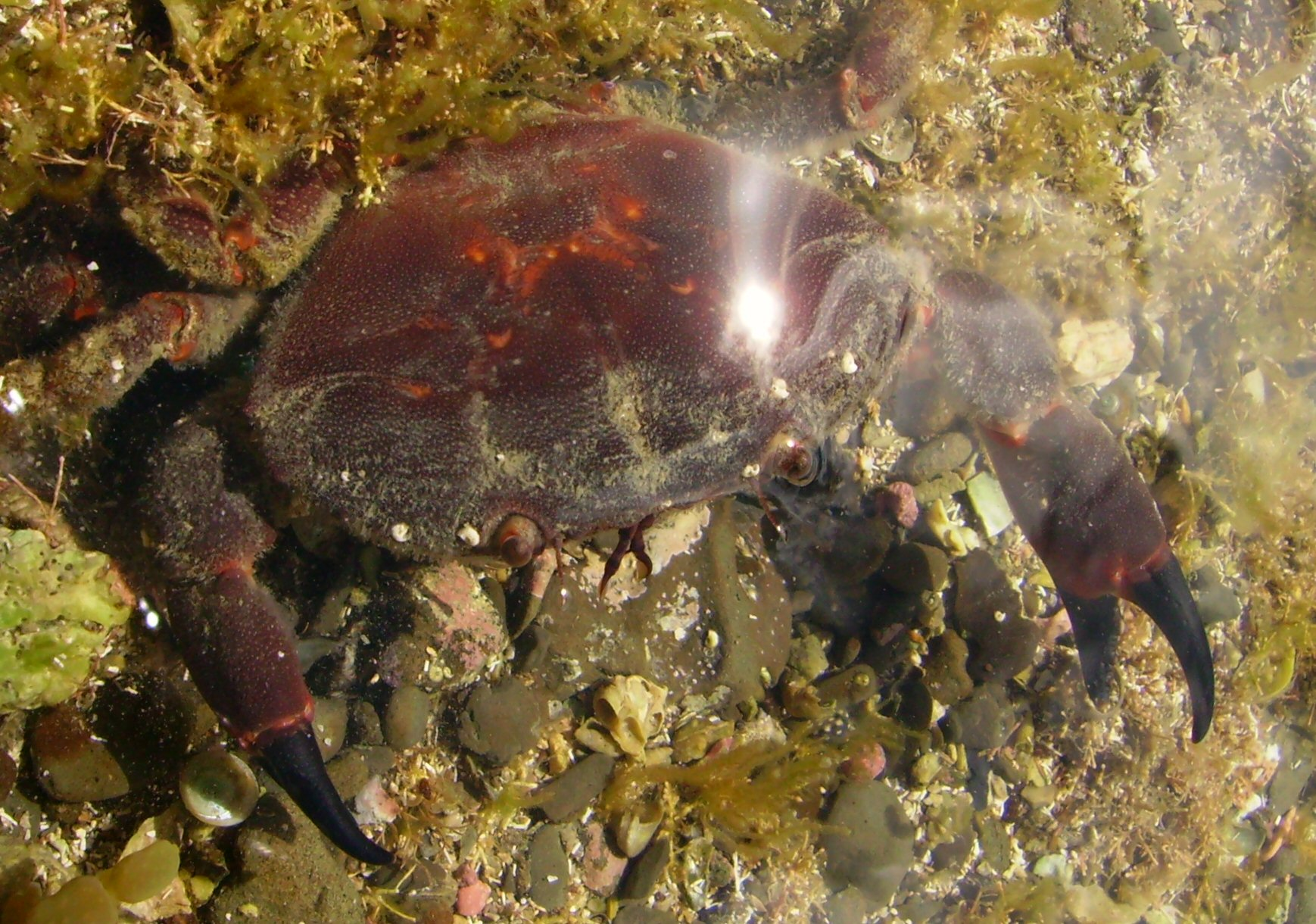

Scientific classification
- Kingdom: Animalia
- Phylum: Arthropoda
- Clade: Pancrustacea
- Class: Malacostraca
- Order: Decapoda
- Suborder: Pleocyemata
- Infraorder: Brachyura
- Family: Oziidae
- Genus: Ozius
- Species: O. truncatus

Binomial name
- Ozius truncatus H. Milne-Edwards, 1834

= Ozius truncatus =

Species of crab

Ozius truncatus, the reef crab or black finger crab is a crustacean of the family Oziidae, endemic to Australia. It is distributed across southern and south western Australia, including Western Australia, South Australia, Victoria and southern NSW. A similar species Ozius deplanatus is found in eastern Australia and New Zealand, and was historically known as Ozius truncatus. In Australia the distribution of truncatus and deplanatus overlaps. Differences between the two species include that in Ozius truncatus the epibranchial ridge is broken by a groove, and the carapace is a little wider in deplanatus. The carapace is up to nearly 60 mm across, and oval in shape, around 1.4 to 1.5 times as long as wide. Ozius truncatus lives in the intertidal zone, feeding on marine snails, limpets and other small invertebrates.
