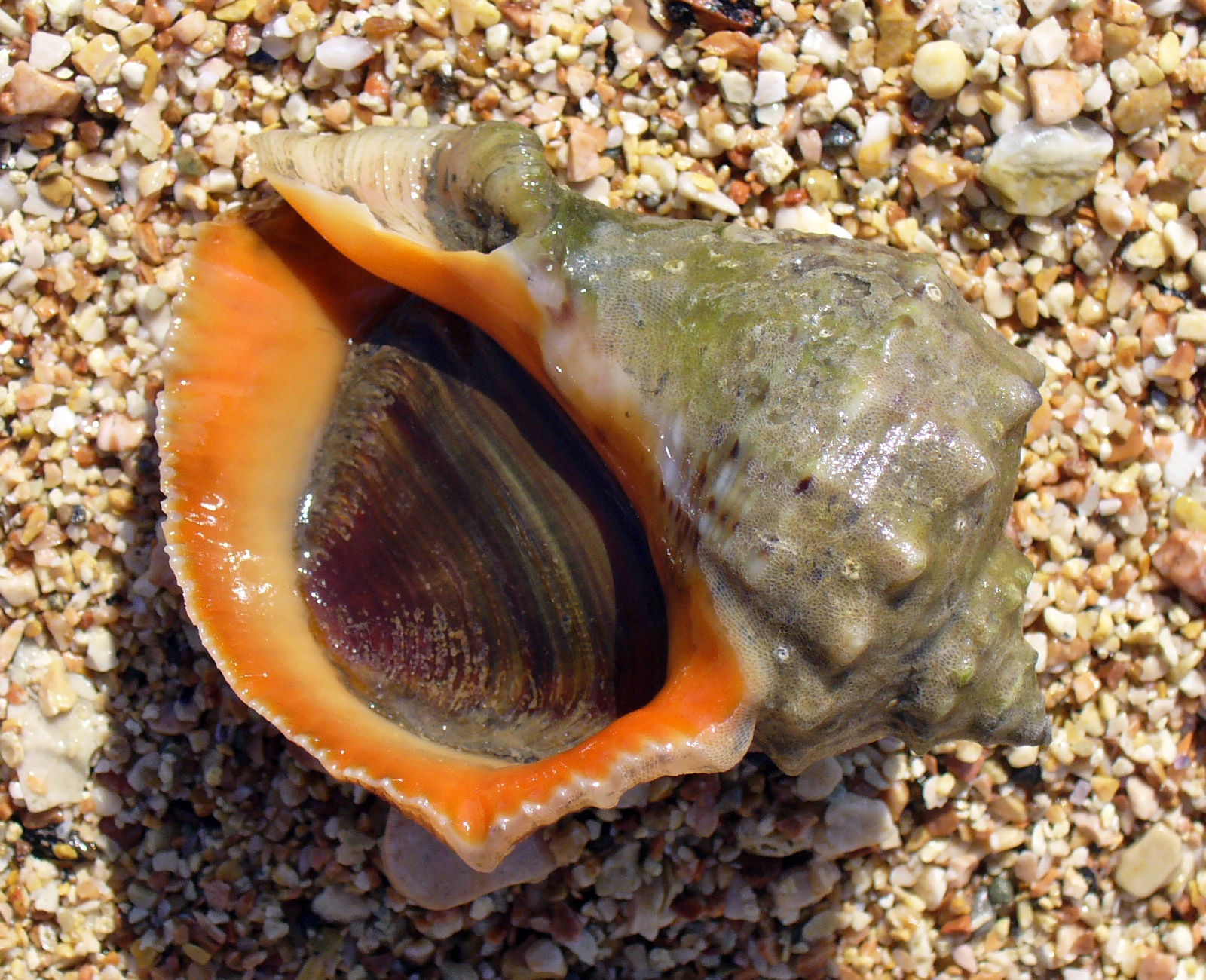
- A live but retracted individual of Rapana venosa showing the operculum, anterior end of the shell towards the upper left in this image. From the Black Sea, 2008

Scientific classification
- Kingdom: Animalia
- Phylum: Mollusca
- Class: Gastropoda
- Subclass: Caenogastropoda
- Order: Neogastropoda
- Family: Muricidae
- Subfamily: Rapaninae
- Genus: Rapana; H. C. F. Schumacher, 1817

= Rapana =

Genus of gastropods

Rapana is a genus of large predatory sea snails, marine gastropod mollusks in the family Muricidae, the rock snails.

== Description ==
The shell of Rapana has a large body whorl, a correspondingly large aperture and a low spire. The surface is covered in a thin calcitic layer. The rachidian teeth have three large cusps but no marginal cusps, instead the outer sides of the lateral cusps on the rachidian have a comb-like region.

== Species ==
Species within the genus Rapana include:

- Rapana bezoar (Linnaeus, 1767)
- Rapana rapiformis (Born, 1778)
- Rapana venosa (Valenciennes, 1846)

Synonyms

- Rapana bella G. Nevill & H. Nevill, 1869: synonym of Rapa rapa (Linnaeus, 1758)
- Rapana bulbosa (Dillwyn, 1817): synonym of Rapana rapiformis (Born, 1778)
- Rapana clathrata A. Adams, 1854: synonym of Coralliophila clathrata (A. Adams, 1854) (original combination)
- Rapana coralliophila A. Adams, 1854: synonym of Coralliophila erosa (Röding, 1798) (junior synonym)
- Rapana foliacea Schumacher, 1817: synonym of Rapana bezoar (Linnaeus, 1767)
- Rapana fragilis A. Adams, 1854: synonym of Coralliophila erosa (Röding, 1798)
- Rapana fritschi E. von Martens, 1874: synonym of Coralliophila fritschi (E. von Martens, 1874) (original combination)
- Rapana fusiformis Martens, 1902: synonym of Mipus fusiformis (Martens, 1902) (original combination)
- † Rapana imperialis Hertlein & E. K. Jordan, 1927: synonym of † Califrapana vaquerosensis (Arnold, 1907)
- Rapana japonica Dunker, 1882: synonym of Babelomurex japonicus (Dunker, 1882) (original combination)
- Rapana lischkeana Dunker, 1882: synonym of Babelomurex lischkeanus (Dunker, 1882) (original combination)
- Rapana mira Cotton & Godfrey, 1932: synonym of Coralliophila mira (Cotton & Godfrey, 1932) (original combination)
- † Rapana neozelanica: synonym of † Fascioplex liraecostata (Suter, 1917) (original combination)
- Rapana nodosa A. Adams, 1854: synonym of Coralliophila nodosa (A. Adams, 1854) (original combination)
- Rapana pechiliensis Grabau & S. G. King, 1928: synonym of Rapana venosa (Valenciennes, 1846)
- Rapana pellucida Bozzetti, 2008: synonym of Rapa rapa (Linnaeus, 1758)
- Rapana pontica F. Nordsieck, 1968: synonym of Rapana venosa (Valenciennes, 1846)
- Rapana pulchella A. Adams, 1854: synonym of Coralliophila pulchella (A. Adams, 1854) (original combination)
- Rapana rhodostoma A. Adams, 1855: synonym of Latirus rhodostoma (A. Adams, 1855) (original combination)
- † Rapana serrai Wiedey, 1928: synonym of †Califrapana vaquerosensis (Arnold, 1907)
- Rapana suturalis (A. Adams in H. Adams & A. Adams, 1853): synonym of Coralliophila erosa (Röding, 1798)
- Rapana thomasiana Crosse, 1861: synonym of Rapana venosa (Valenciennes, 1846) (synonym)
- † Rapana waihaoensis Suter, 1917 : synonym of † Fascioplex neozelanica (Suter, 1917)
