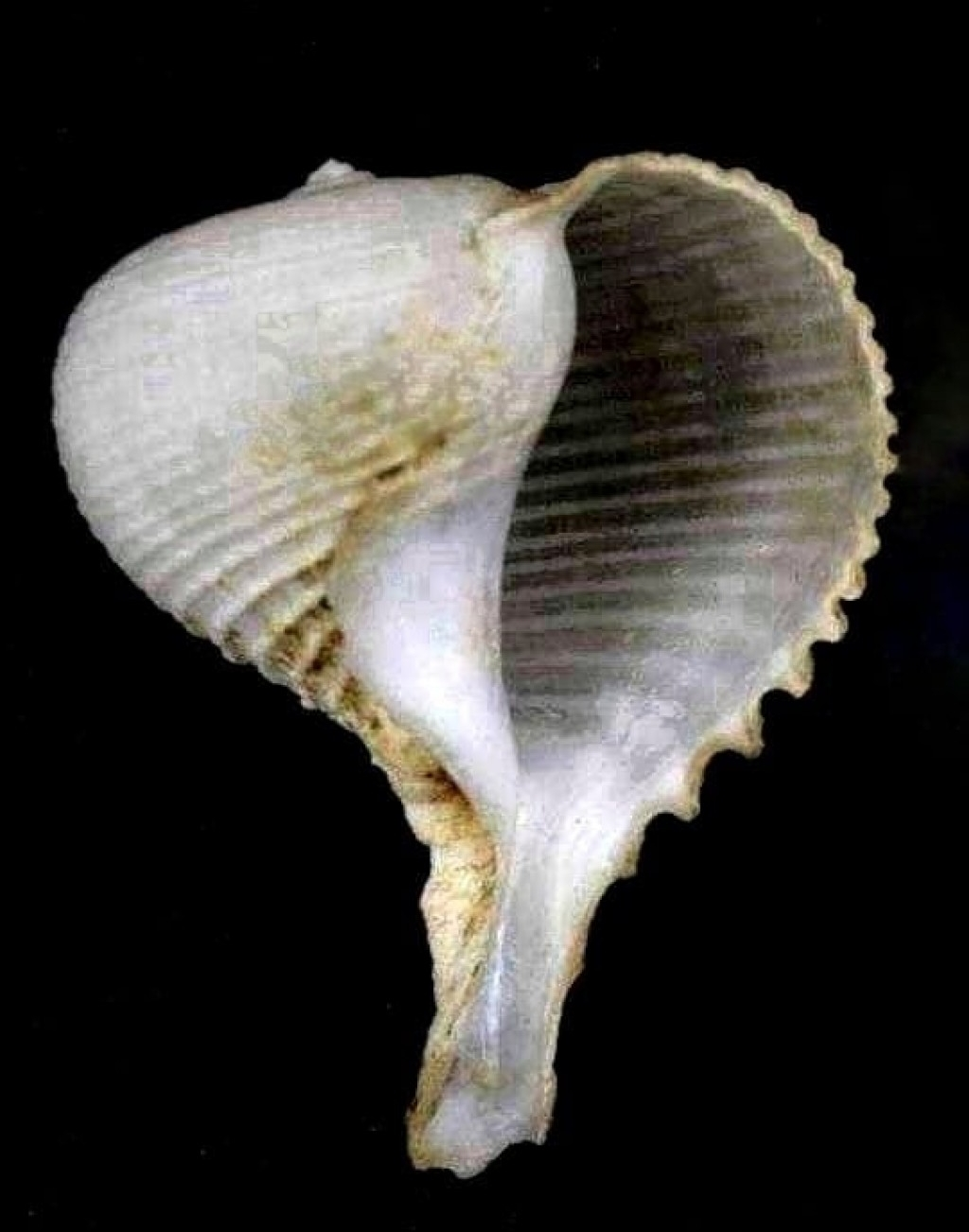
- Rapa rapa

Scientific classification
- Kingdom: Animalia
- Phylum: Mollusca
- Class: Gastropoda
- Subclass: Caenogastropoda
- Order: Neogastropoda
- Family: Muricidae
- Subfamily: Coralliophilinae
- Genus: Rapa; Röding, 1798

= Rapa (gastropod) =

Genus of gastropods

Rapa is a genus of sea snails, marine gastropod mollusks in the family Muricidae, the murex snails or rock snails.

== Description ==
The thin shell is globosely pyriform with the axis perforate and the umbilicus partly concealed by the reflected inner lip. The spire is obtuse. The aperture is oblong, produced anteriorly into a wide subrecurved canal.

Rapa differs from Rapana not only in the produced canal of the aperture and thin simple whorls, but in the free, reflexed inner lip and moderate umbilicus.

== Species ==
Species within the genus Rapa include:

- Rapa bulbiformis G.B. Sowerby II, 1870
- Rapa franzhuberi Thach, 2023
- Rapa incurva (Dunker, 1852)
- Rapa rapa (Linnaeus, 1758)

Synonyms

- Rapa bulbosa: synonym of Rapana rapiformis (Born, 1778)
- Rapa papyracea (Lamarck, 1822): synonym of Rapa rapa (Linnaeus, 1758)
- Rapa pellucida Röding, 1798: synonym of Rapa rapa (Linnaeus, 1758)
- Rapa penardi Montroux: synonym of Rapa rapa (Linnaeus, 1758)
- Rapa striata Röding, 1798: synonym of Rapa rapa (Linnaeus, 1758)
- † Rapa supraplicata Conrad, 1858: synonym of †Gyrodes supraplicatus (Conrad, 1858) (basionym)
- Rapa tenuis H. Adams & A. Adams, 1858: synonym of Rapa rapa (Linnaeus, 1758)
- Rapa volema Röding, 1798: synonym of Rapana rapiformis (Born, 1778)
