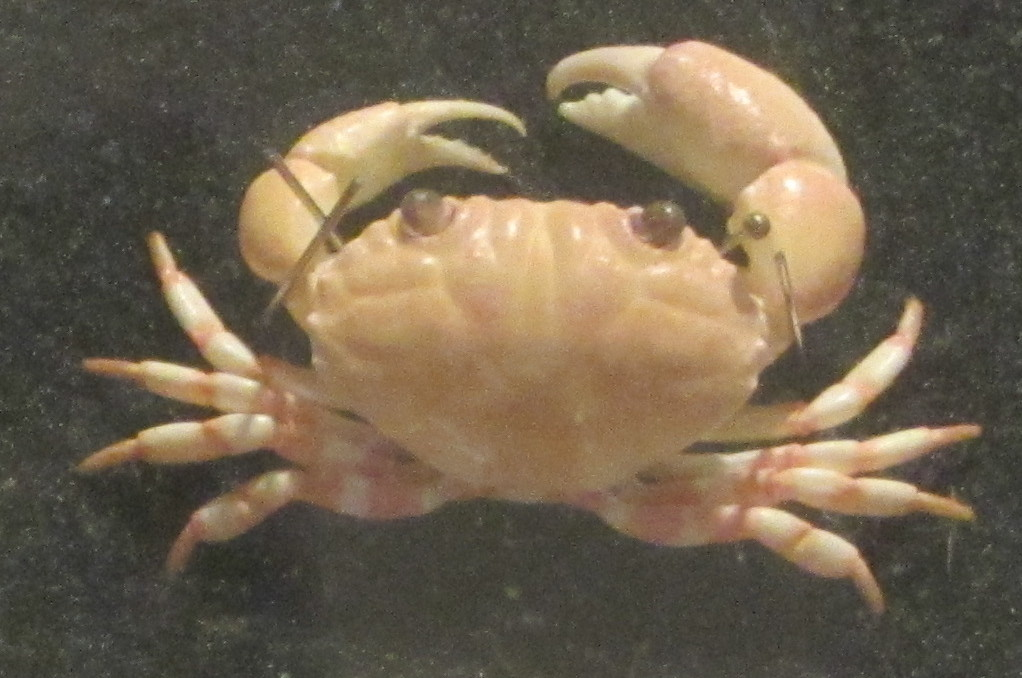

Scientific classification
- Kingdom: Animalia
- Phylum: Arthropoda
- Class: Malacostraca
- Order: Decapoda
- Suborder: Pleocyemata
- Infraorder: Brachyura
- Family: Oziidae
- Genus: Lydia
- Species: L. annulipes

Binomial name
- Lydia annulipes (H. Milne Edwards, 1834)

= Lydia annulipes =

Species of crustaceans

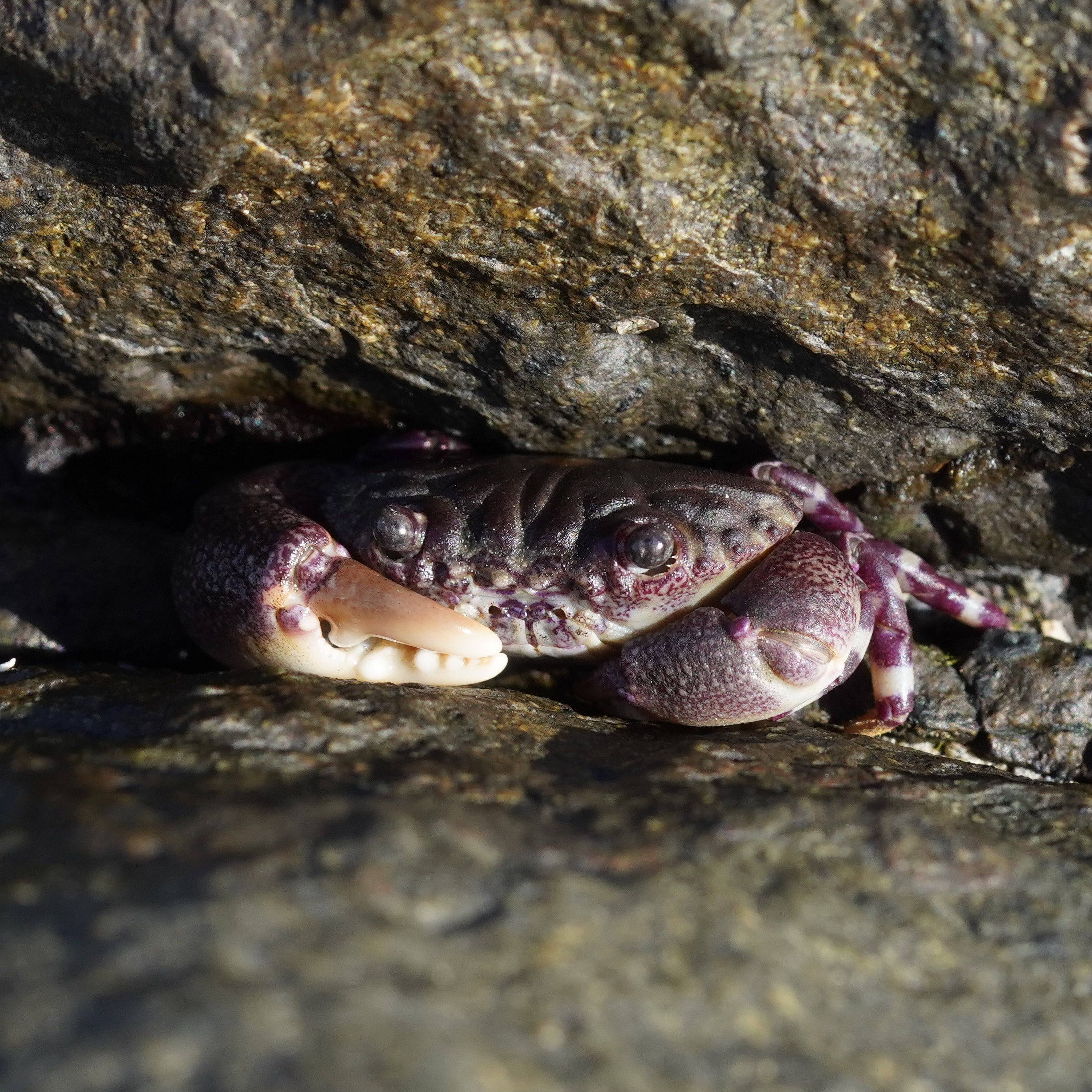
Lydia annulipes

Lydia annulipes is a species of crab in the family Oziidae. Coloration varies from brown to red brown to purple, with purple or red brown bands on the walking legs. The right claw of individuals collected has been found to be larger than the left claw.

The carapace is oval in shape, wider than long, up to 25 mm (0.98 in) across in large individuals, deeply furrowed in the front area, and smooth as are the legs. There are 5 pointed lobes on the sides of the carapace including the one behind the eye. The large, cutting claw which is rough above has one large rounded tooth at the base.

Lydia annulipes is found across the Indo-Pacific ocean. Individuals live in crevices and holes in rock just below the high tide line.
