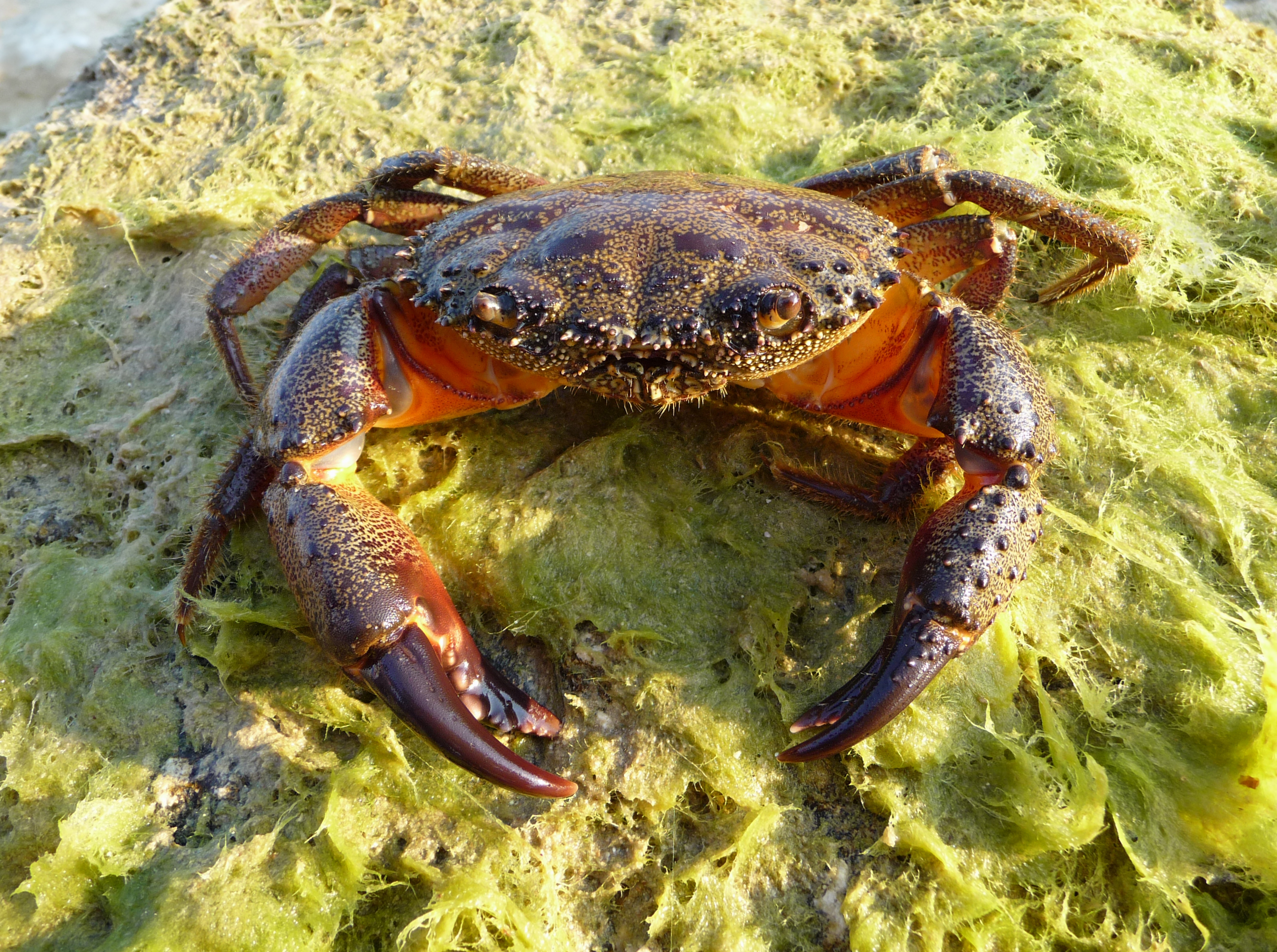

Scientific classification
- Kingdom: Animalia
- Phylum: Arthropoda
- Clade: Pancrustacea
- Class: Malacostraca
- Order: Decapoda
- Suborder: Pleocyemata
- Infraorder: Brachyura
- Family: Eriphiidae
- Genus: Eriphia
- Species: E. verrucosa

Binomial name
- Eriphia verrucosa (Forsskål, 1775)

Synonyms
- Eriphia spinifrons Rathke, 1837

= Eriphia verrucosa =

Species of crab

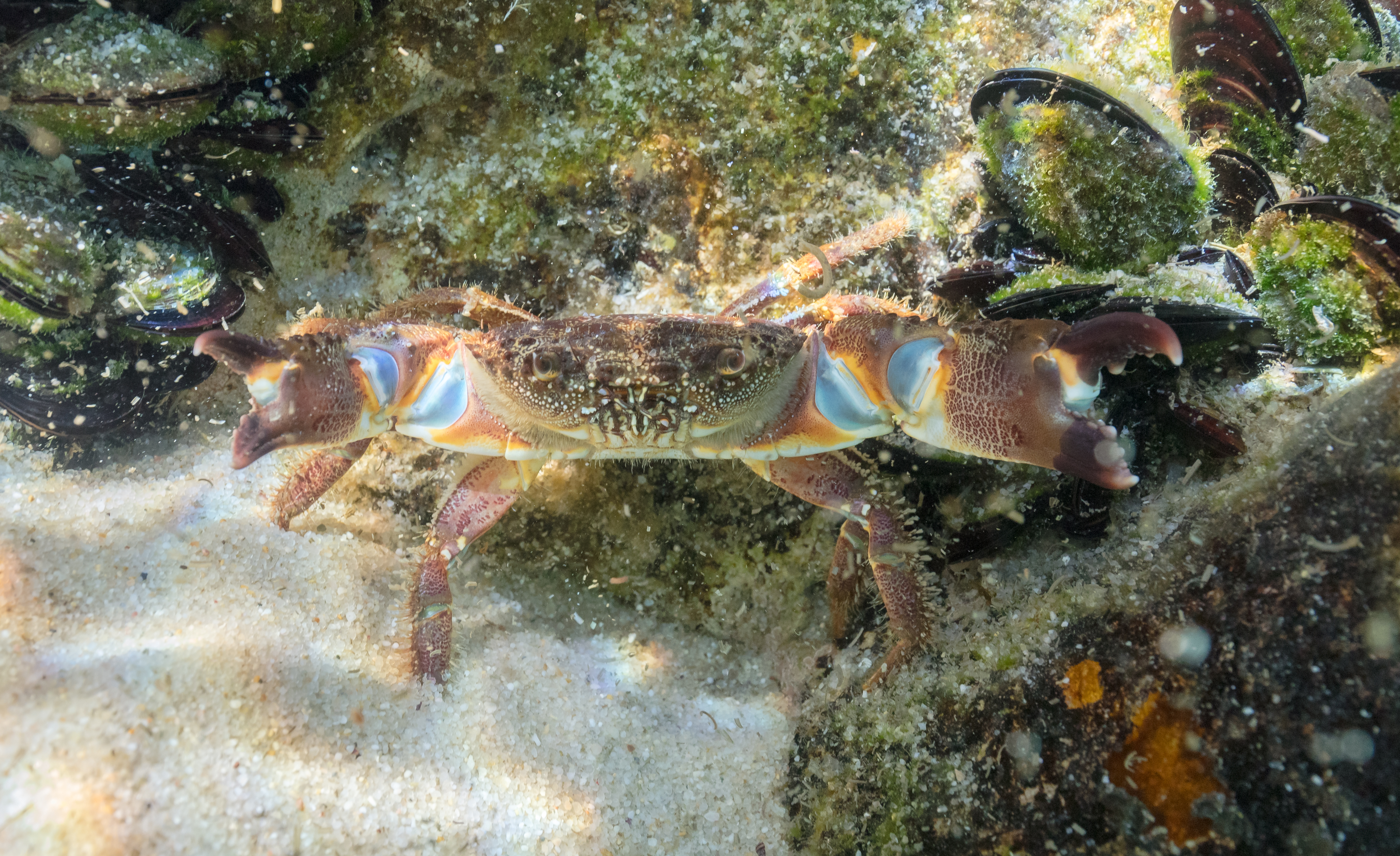
Exemplar in defense position underwater.

Eriphia verrucosa, sometimes called the warty crab or yellow crab, is a species of crab found in the Black Sea, Mediterranean Sea and eastern Atlantic Ocean from Brittany to Mauritania and the Azores. Individual crabs have been caught as far north as Cornwall. Formerly a frequent species in the Black Sea, it has decreased in numbers since the 1980s and is now listed in the Ukrainian Red Data Book of endangered species.

== Ecology ==
Eriphia verrucosa lives among stones and seaweeds in shallow water along rocky coastlines up to a depth of 15 metres (49 ft). It is reported to feed on bivalves, gastropods and hermit crabs, or on molluscs and polychaetes. In the Black Sea, E. verrucosa is the only native species capable of breaking into the shells of the invasive snail Rapana venosa, although it is unlikely that it will present an effective biological control of the invader. The species is threatened by eutrophication and pollution.

== Description ==
Eriphia verrucosa may reach a width of 9 centimetres (3.5 in) and a length of 7 cm (2.8 in). The carapace is thick and smooth, ranging in colour from brownish-red to brownish-green, with yellow spots; its front margin is armed with seven "teeth" on either side, and five or six between the eyes. The claws are strong and have black fingers; one claw is generally larger than the other and is armed with rounded tubercles while the smaller claw bears sharper projections, arranged in lines. In the springtime, E. verrucosa migrates to shallow water, less than 1 metre (3 ft 3 in) deep, and reproduction begins in May or June; the species is highly fecund. There are four larval stages, from zoea to megalopa.
