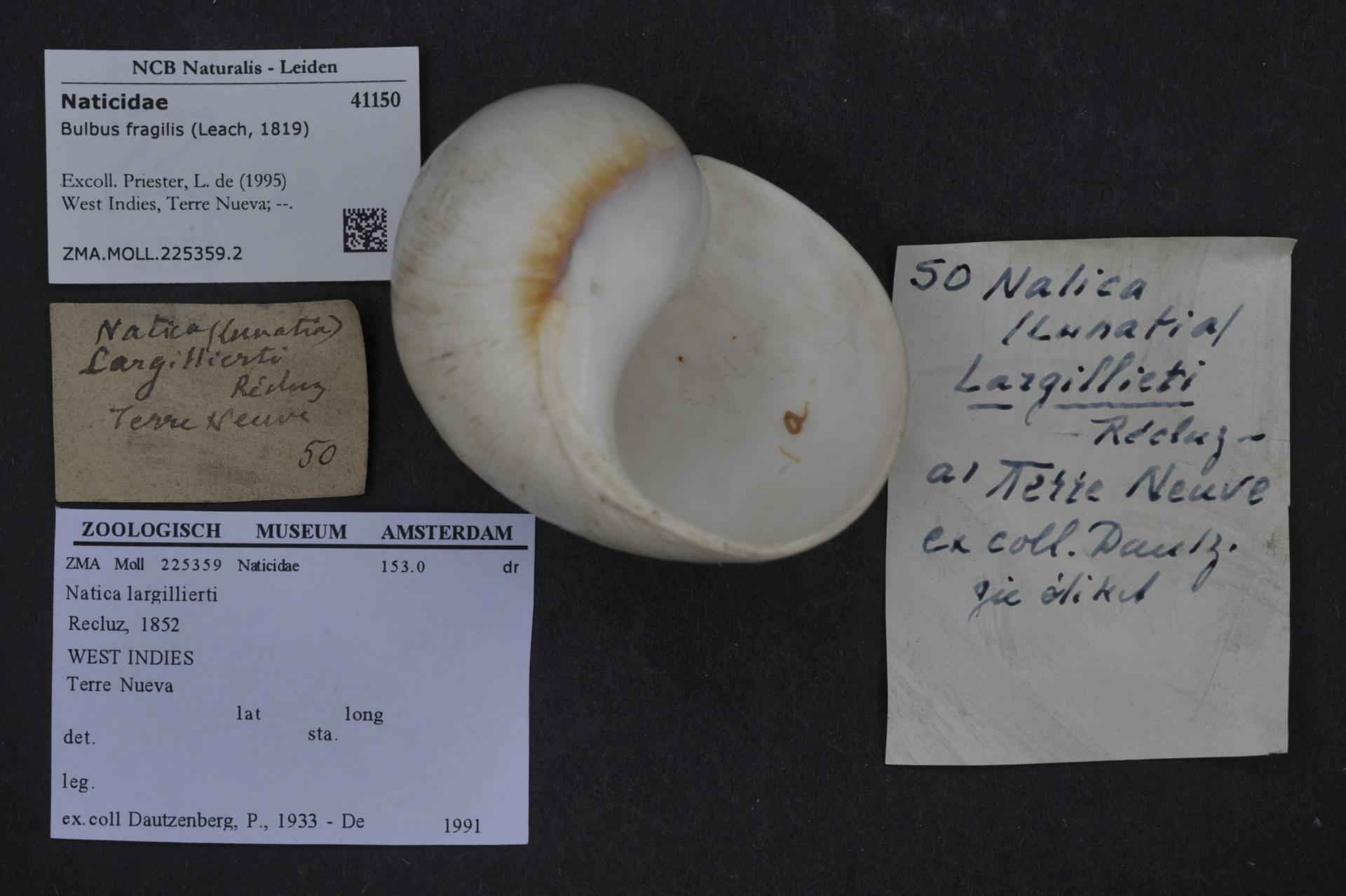
- Bulbus fragilis shell

Scientific classification
- Kingdom: Animalia
- Phylum: Mollusca
- Class: Gastropoda
- Subclass: Caenogastropoda
- Order: Littorinimorpha
- Superfamily: Naticoidea
- Family: Naticidae
- Genus: Bulbus; T. Brown, 1839

Type species
- Bulbus smithii T. Brown, 1839

Synonyms
- Acrybia H. Adams & A. Adams, 1853

= Bulbus (gastropod) =

Genus of gastropods

Bulbus is a genus of predatory sea snails, marine gastropod mollusks in the family Naticidae, the moon snails.

== Species ==
Species within the genus Bulbus include:

- Bulbus fragilis (Leach, 1819)
- Bulbus normalis (Middendorff, 1851)
- Bulbus smithii Brown, 1839
- Bulbus striatus Golikov & Sirenko, 1983
- Bulbus tenuiculus (G.B. Sowerby III, 1915)

Species brought into synonymy

- Bulbus benthicolus Dell, 1990: synonym of Falsilunatia benthicola (Dell, 1990)
- Bulbus carcellesi Dell, 1990: synonym of Falsilunatia carcellesi (Dell, 1990)
- Bulbus flavus (Gould, 1839): synonym of Bulbus smithii T. Brown, 1839
- Bulbus globosus (Jeffreys, 1885): synonym of Phalium saburon (Bruguière, 1792)
- Bulbus incurvus Dunker, 1852: synonym of Rapa incurva (Dunker, 1852)
- Bulbus scotianus Dell, 1990 Dell, 1990: synonym of Falsilunatia scotiana (Dell, 1990)
