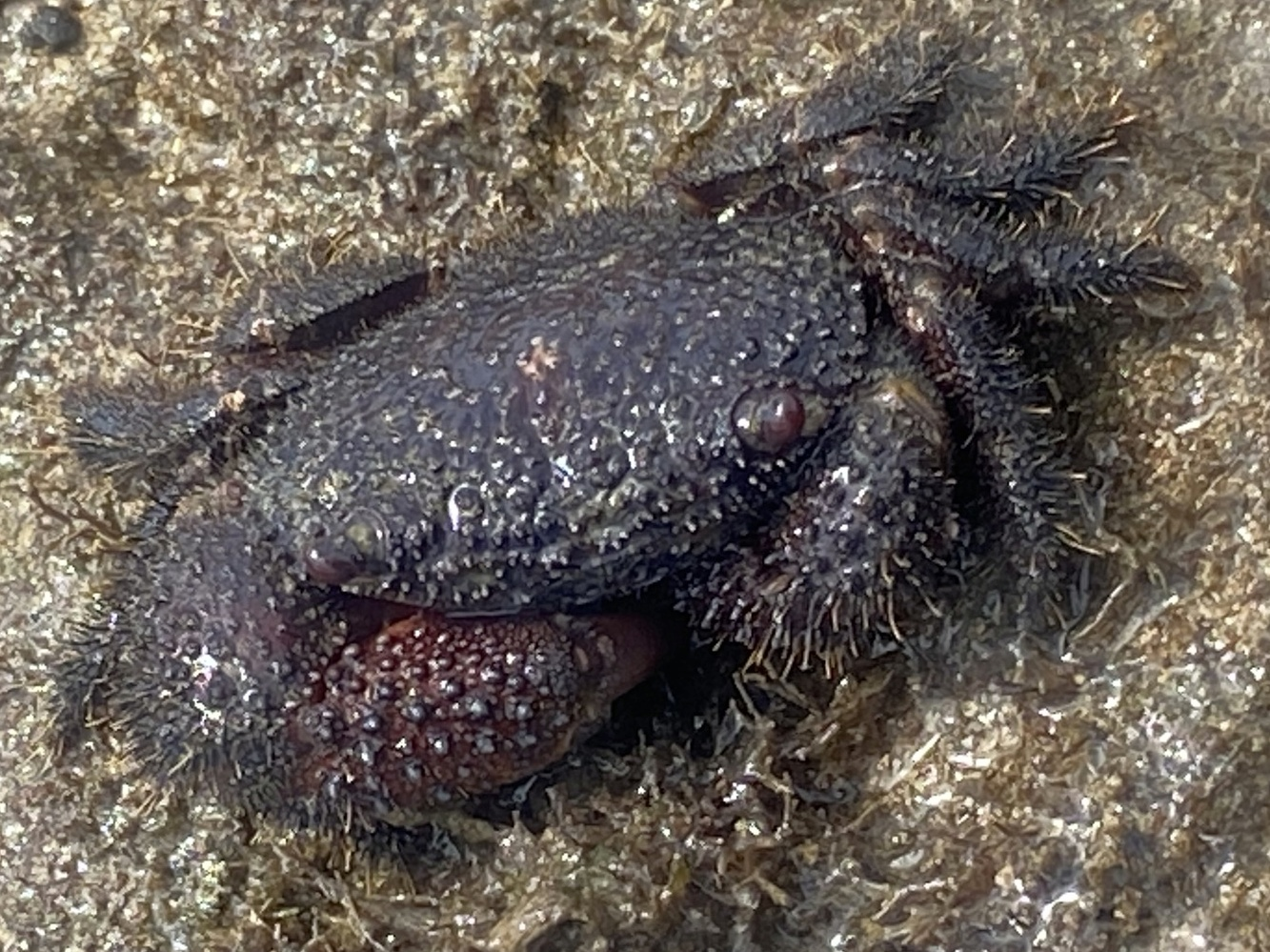
- Eriphides hispida

Scientific classification
- Kingdom: Animalia
- Phylum: Arthropoda
- Class: Malacostraca
- Order: Decapoda
- Suborder: Pleocyemata
- Infraorder: Brachyura
- Family: Eriphiidae
- Genus: Eriphides; Rathbun, 1897
- Species: E. hispida

Binomial name
- Eriphides hispida (Stimpson, 1860)

Synonyms
- Pseuderiphia A. Milne-Edwards, 1880 (homonym); Eriphia hispida Stimpson, 1860

= Eriphides =

Genus of crabs

Eriphides is a genus of crabs in the family Eriphiidae. The only recognized species in this genus is Eriphides hispida, also known as the purple bristle crab. It is known from the eastern Pacific Ocean.
