= Epixanthus =

Scientific classification
- Kingdom: Animalia
- Phylum: Arthropoda
- Class: Malacostraca
- Order: Decapoda
- Suborder: Pleocyemata
- Infraorder: Brachyura
- Family: Oziidae
- Genus: Epixanthus; Heller, 1860

Genus of crabs

Epixanthus is a genus of marine crustaceans in the family Oziidae. It includes 7 species.
