= Rapa bulbiformis =

Scientific classification
- Kingdom: Animalia
- Phylum: Mollusca
- Class: Gastropoda
- Subclass: Caenogastropoda
- Order: Neogastropoda
- Family: Muricidae
- Subfamily: Coralliophilinae
- Genus: Rapa
- Species: R. bulbiformis

Binomial name
- Rapa bulbiformis G. B. Sowerby II, 1870

Species of gastropod

Rapa bulbiformis is a species of sea snail, a marine gastropod mollusk in the family Muricidae, the murex snails or rock snails.

== Distribution ==
Pacific Ocean: Queensland, Australia.
