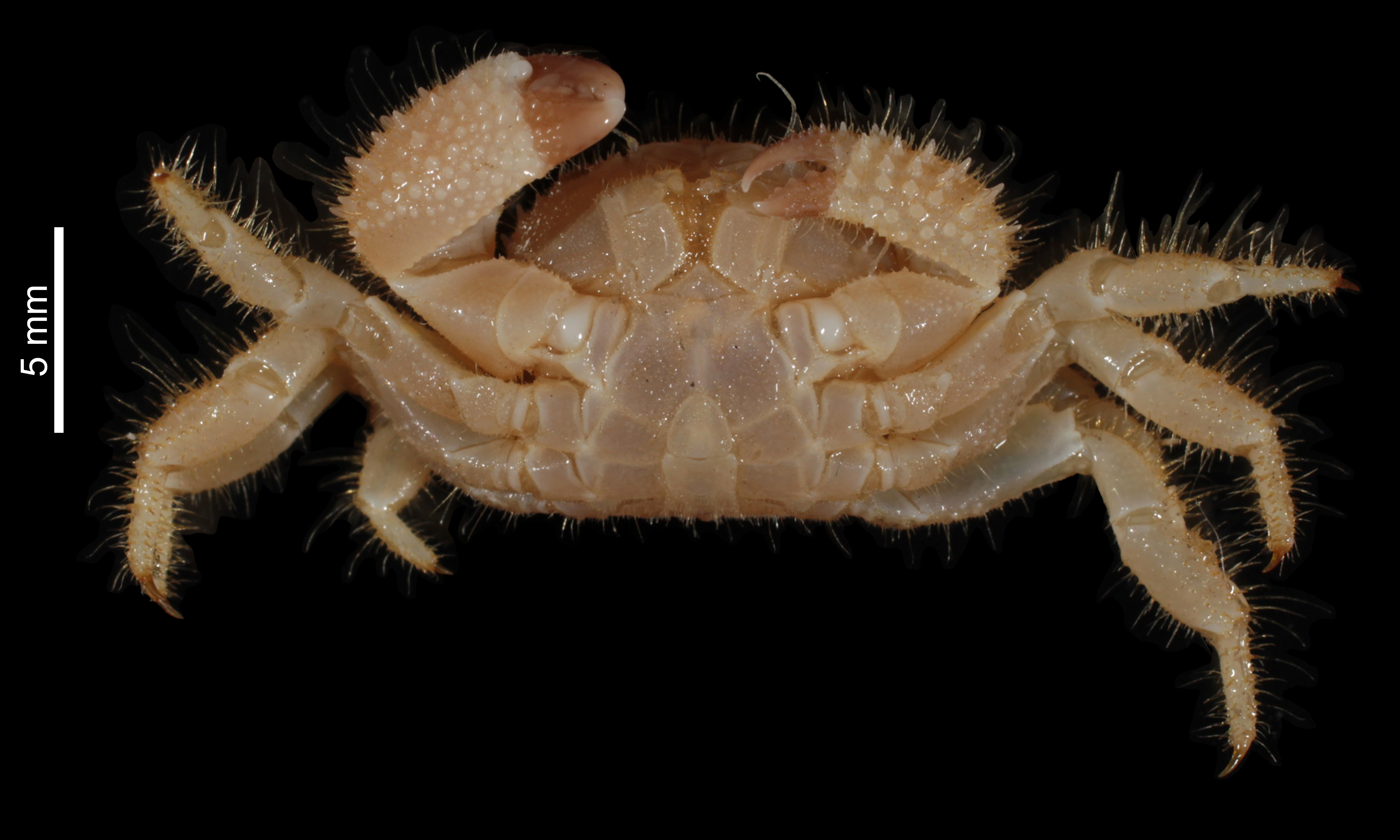

Scientific classification
- Kingdom: Animalia
- Phylum: Arthropoda
- Class: Malacostraca
- Order: Decapoda
- Suborder: Pleocyemata
- Infraorder: Brachyura
- Family: Oziidae
- Genus: Eupilumnus; Kossmann, 1877

Synonyms
- Globopilumnus Balss, 1933; Pilumnus (Eupilumnus) Kossmann, 1877

= Eupilumnus =

Genus of crabs

Eupilumnus is a genus of marine crabs in the family Oziidae. Globopilumnus ( another genus that was formerly assigned to the family Eriphiidae) has since been synonymized with Eupilumnus.
