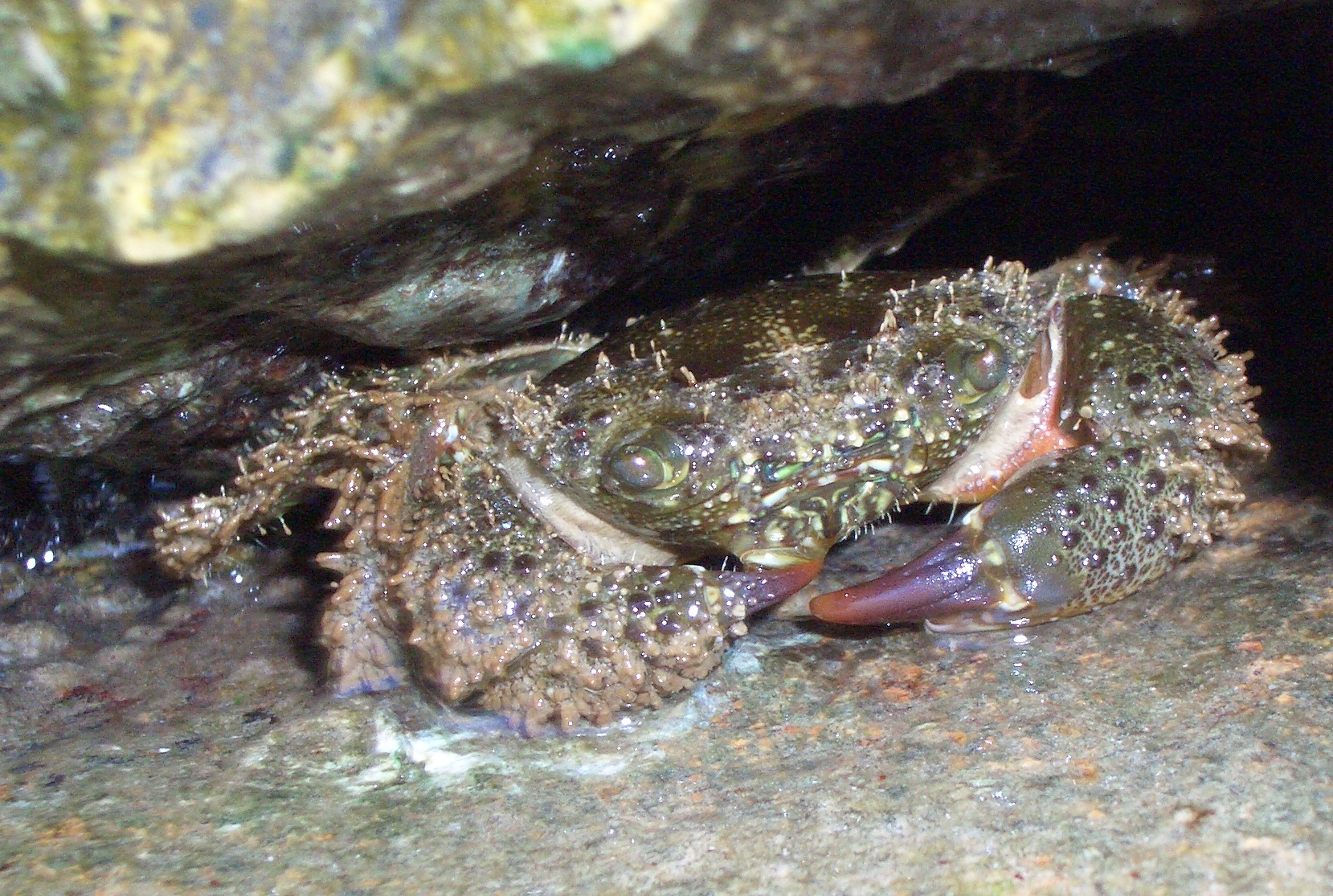
- Eriphia verrucosa

Scientific classification
- Kingdom: Animalia
- Phylum: Arthropoda
- Class: Malacostraca
- Order: Decapoda
- Suborder: Pleocyemata
- Infraorder: Brachyura
- Family: Eriphiidae
- Genus: Eriphia; Latreille, 1817

Type species
- Cancer spinifrons Herbst, 1785

= Eriphia =

Genus of crabs

Eriphia is a genus of marine crabs in the family Eriphiidae. These crabs are common in most temperate and tropical seas.

== Species ==
The genus contains the following eight extant species:

Image	Scientific name	Distribution
	Eriphia ferox Koh & Ng, 2008	northwestern Pacific
	Eriphia gonagra (Fabricius, 1781)	Western Atlantic Ocean
	Eriphia granulosa A. Milne-Edwards, 1880	the western Atlantic
	Eriphia scabricula Dana, 1852	Indo-Pacific.
	Eriphia sebana (Shaw & Nodder, 1803)	Indo-Pacific: north from Japan, China, Taiwan to southeast Asia, west to Australia, Christmas Island, Cocos (Keeling) Islands to India, Oman and east Africa.
	Eriphia squamata Stimpson, 1860	eastern Pacific
	Eriphia smithii MacLeay, 1838	Indo-Pacific
	Eriphia verrucosa (Forskål, 1775)	Black Sea, Mediterranean Sea and eastern Atlantic Ocean from Brittany to Mauritania and the Azores

There is also one fossil species, †Eriphia cocchii Ristori, 1886.
