= Bountiana =

Scientific classification
- Kingdom: Animalia
- Phylum: Arthropoda
- Class: Malacostraca
- Order: Decapoda
- Suborder: Pleocyemata
- Infraorder: Brachyura
- Family: Oziidae
- Genus: Bountiana; Davie & Ng, 2000
- Species: B. norfolcensis

Binomial name
- Bountiana norfolcensis (Grant & McCulloch, 1907)

Synonyms
- Species synonymy: Eriphia norfolcensis Grant & McCulloch, 1907

Genus of crabs

Bountiana is a genus of marine crabs in the family Oziidae. It is monospecific, containing only the species Bountiana norfolcensis.
