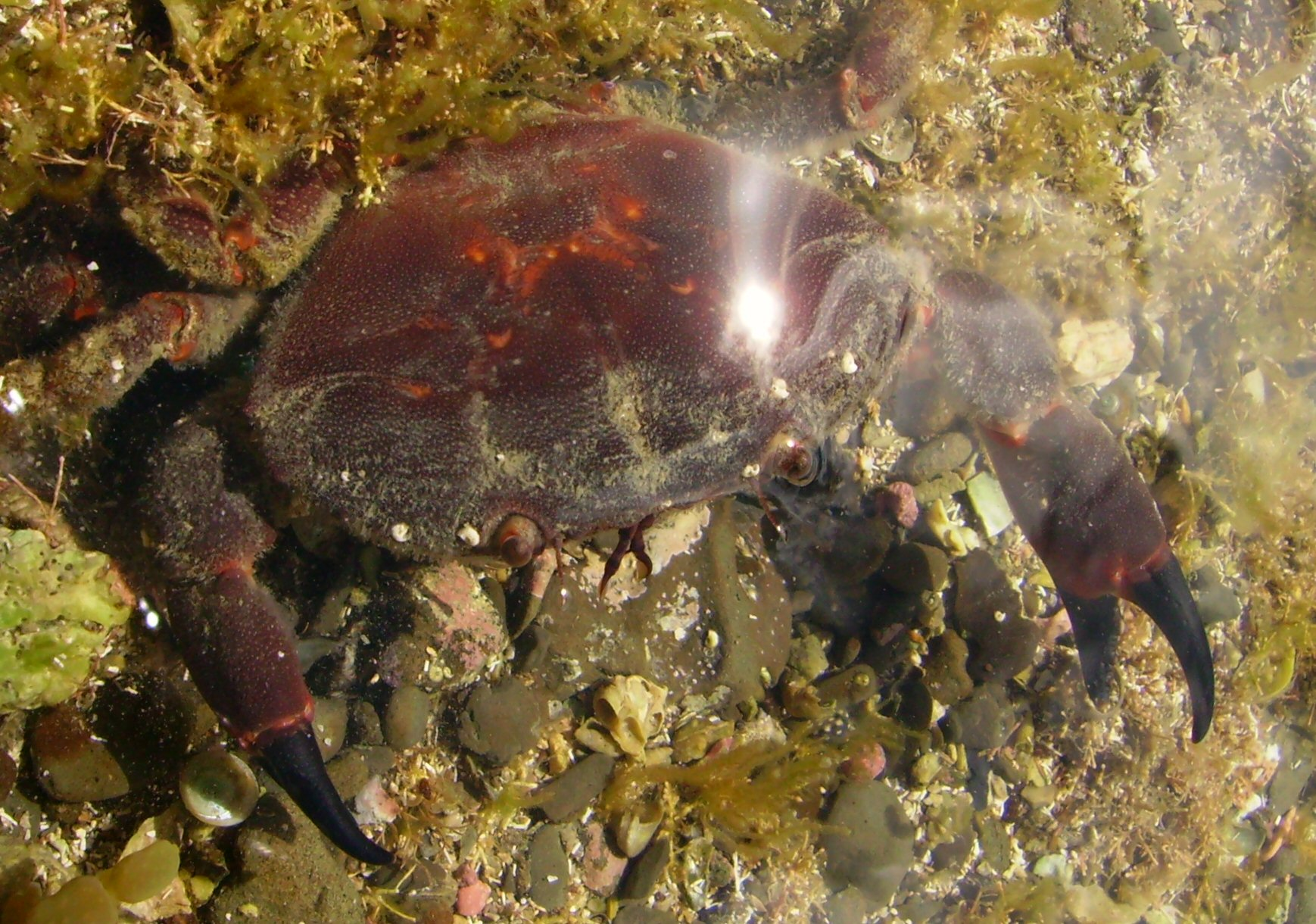
- Ozius truncatus

Scientific classification
- Kingdom: Animalia
- Phylum: Arthropoda
- Clade: Pancrustacea
- Class: Malacostraca
- Order: Decapoda
- Suborder: Pleocyemata
- Infraorder: Brachyura
- Family: Oziidae
- Genus: Ozius; H. Milne-Edwards, 1834

Species
- 13 extant species (see text)

Synonyms
- Ruppellioides A. Milne-Edwards, 1867

= Ozius =

Genus of crabs

Ozius is a genus of marine crabs in the family Oziidae.

== Species ==
There are 13 extant species:

- Ozius deplanatus (White, 1847)
- Ozius granulosus De Man, 1879
- Ozius guttatus H. Milne-Edwards, 1834
- Ozius hawaiiensis Rathbun, 1902
- Ozius lobatus Heller, 1865
- Ozius perlatus Stimpson, 1860
- Ozius philippinensis (Ward, 1941)
- Ozius reticulatus (Desbonne in Desbonne & Schramm, 1867)
- Ozius rugulosus Stimpson, 1858
- Ozius tricarinatus Rathbun, 1907
- Ozius truncatus H. Milne-Edwards, 1834
- Ozius tuberculosus H. Milne-Edwards, 1834
- Ozius verreauxii Saussure, 1853

There is also one species only known from fossils, †Ozius collinsi Karasawa, 1992.
