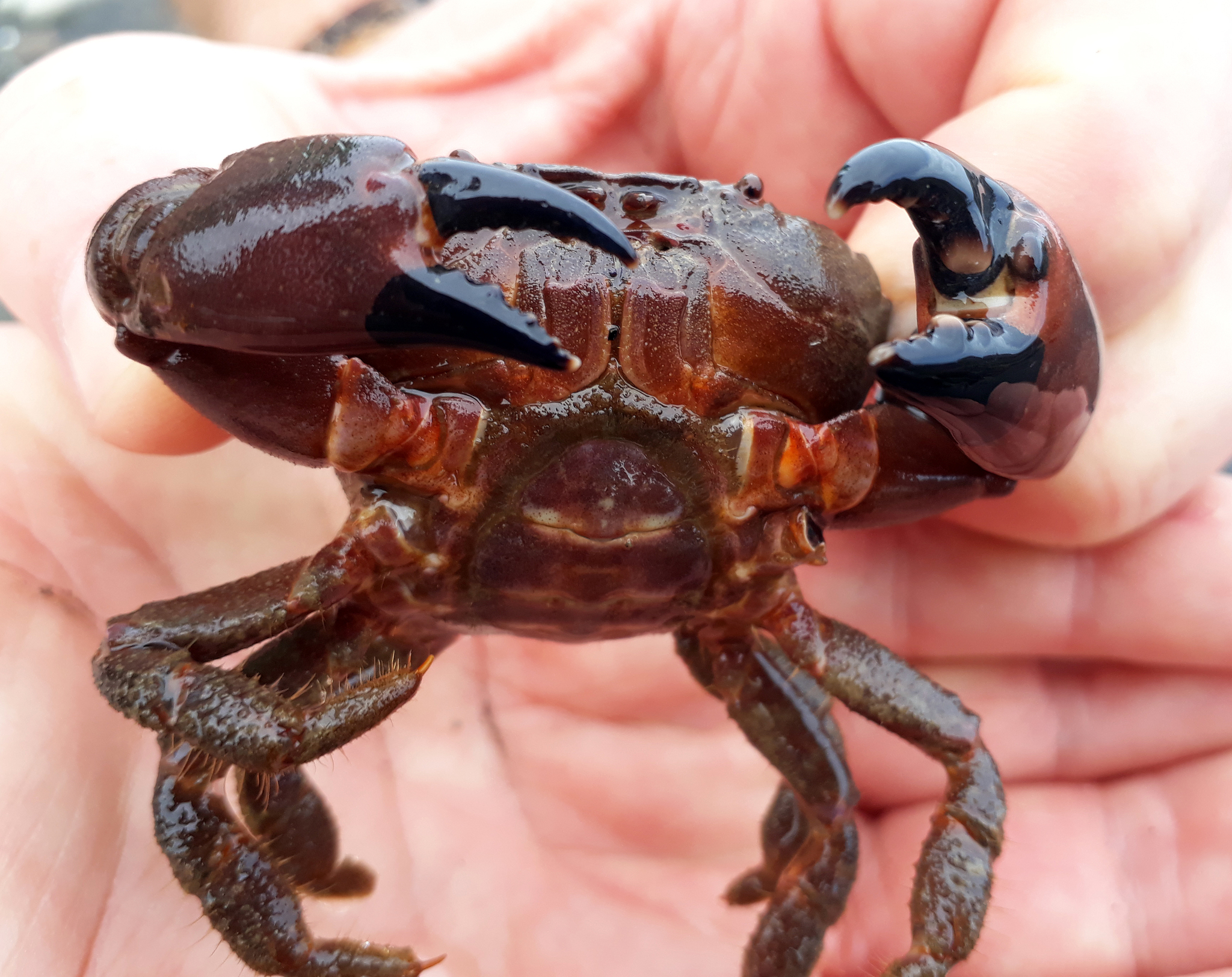

Scientific classification
- Kingdom: Animalia
- Phylum: Arthropoda
- Class: Malacostraca
- Order: Decapoda
- Suborder: Pleocyemata
- Infraorder: Brachyura
- Family: Oziidae
- Genus: Ozius
- Species: O. deplanatus

Binomial name
- Ozius deplanatus (White, 1847)

Synonyms
- Xantho deplanatus White, 1847

= Ozius deplanatus =

Black finger crab

Species of crab

Ozius deplanatus, commonly known as the black finger crab and the iron crab, is a species of crab found in New Zealand and Australia.

== Distribution ==
It is common around the North Island of New Zealand. Found in Australia from Eastern Victoria to New South Wales, on Flinders Island and the Kent Group. It is also found on Lord Howe Island and Norfolk Island.

== Habitat ==
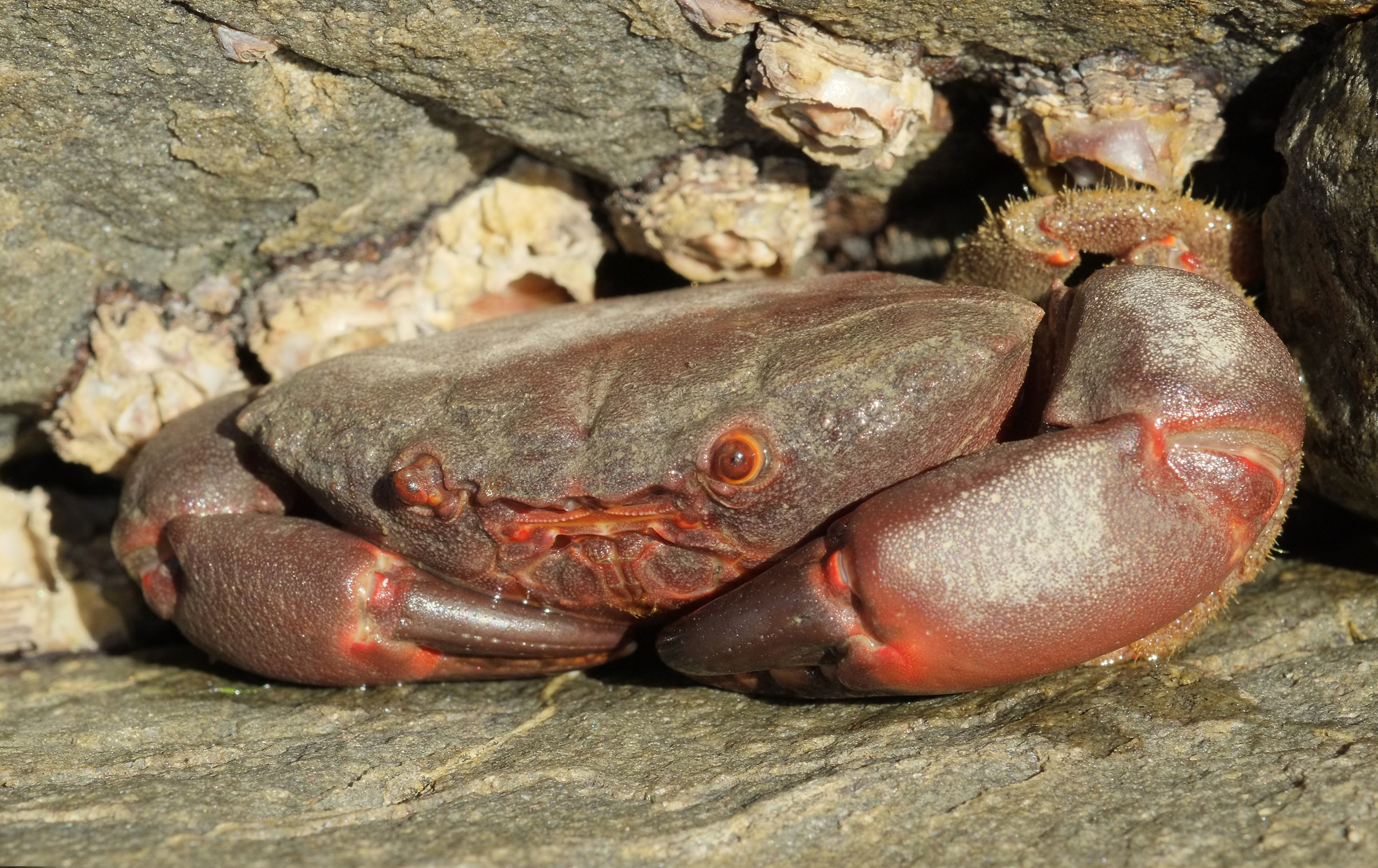

O. deplanatus is found under boulders and among stones in the lower to mid tidal regions of the intertidal zone on sheltered rocky and gravel shores.

It is distributed sparsely, with one individual per 5 m^{2}.

== Description ==
Adults average 57 mm (2.2 in) in size with a flattened oval-shaped carapace that is wide in the front with blunt lobed edges. This can be a rusty red to chocolate brown colour with light mottling. Underside may be a paler cream colour. The antennae are dark red to brown. Claws are large with a smooth texture. Fingers may be black or brown in colour. Walking legs are pale red with golden setae or hairs.

== Behaviour and diet ==
The black finger crab is a scavenger. It feeds on snails, half-crabs and hermit crabs. It is known to chip away at the shells of larger snails before grasping the animal with its mouth-parts. Smaller snails are crushed by the crab's large claws. It also feeds on limpets and chitons by using the tip of its claw to remove them from a rock.

It will spread its claws when started or threatened.
