= Bulbus smithii =

Scientific classification
- Kingdom: Animalia
- Phylum: Mollusca
- Class: Gastropoda
- Subclass: Caenogastropoda
- Order: Littorinimorpha
- Family: Naticidae
- Genus: Bulbus
- Species: B. smithii

Binomial name
- Bulbus smithii Brown, 1839

Species of gastropod

Bulbus smithii is a species of predatory sea snail, a marine gastropod mollusk in the family Naticidae, the moon snails.

== Description ==
The maximum recorded shell length is 39 millimetres (1.5 in).

== Habitat ==
The recorded depth of this species is 325 metres (1,066 ft).
