= Epixanthoides =

Scientific classification
- Kingdom: Animalia
- Phylum: Arthropoda
- Class: Malacostraca
- Order: Decapoda
- Suborder: Pleocyemata
- Infraorder: Brachyura
- Family: Oziidae
- Genus: Epixanthoides; Balss, 1935
- Species: E. anomalus

Binomial name
- Epixanthoides anomalus Balss, 1935

Genus of crabs

Epixanthoides is a genus of marine crustaceans in the family Oziidae. It is monospecific, including only the species Epixanthoides anomalus.
