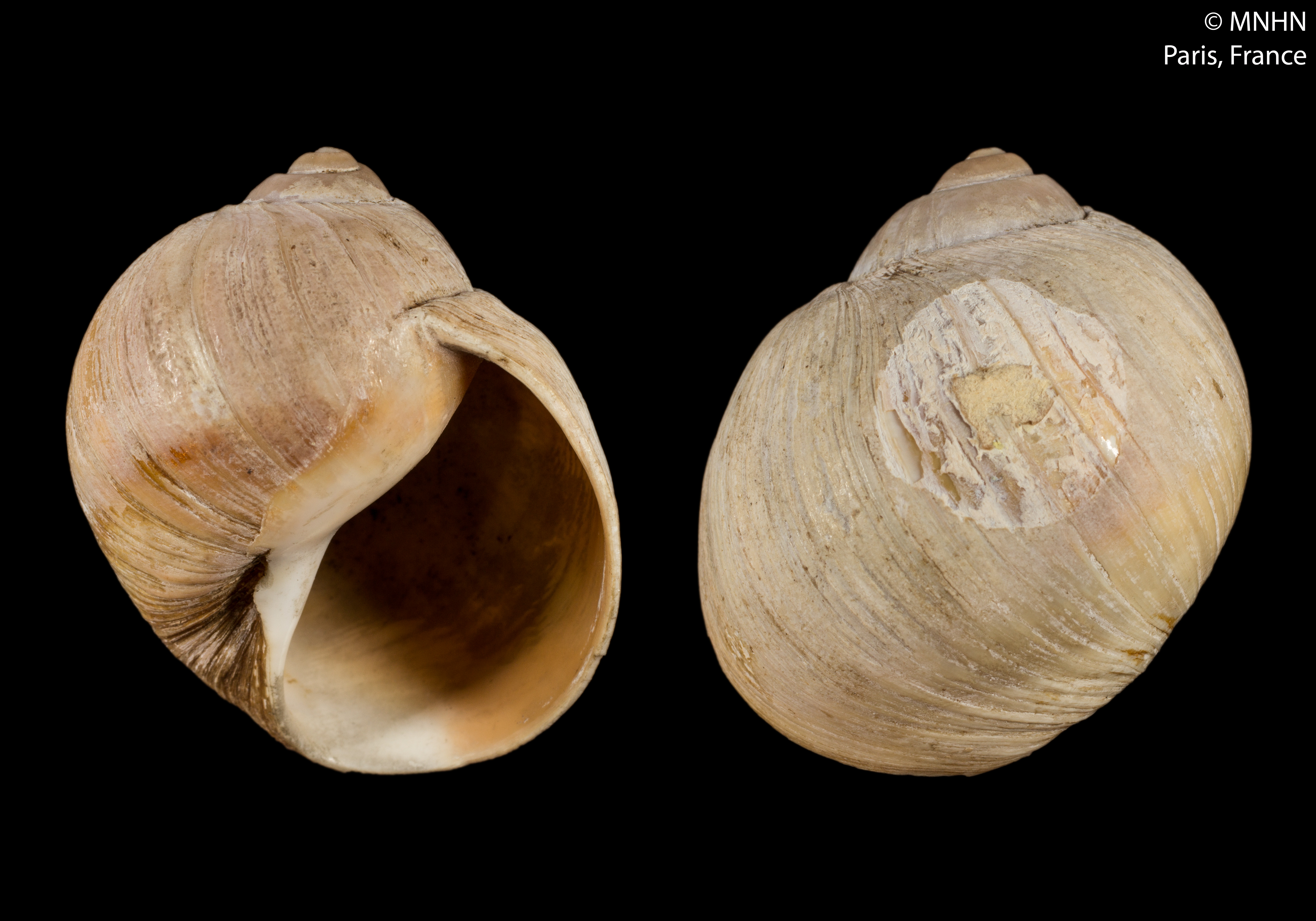
- Bulbus fragilis shell (syntype at MNHN, Paris)

Scientific classification
- Kingdom: Animalia
- Phylum: Mollusca
- Class: Gastropoda
- Subclass: Caenogastropoda
- Order: Littorinimorpha
- Family: Naticidae
- Genus: Bulbus
- Species: B. fragilis

Binomial name
- Bulbus fragilis (Leach, 1819)

Synonyms
- Natica fragilis Leach, 1819 (Doubtful synonym of Bulbus smithii); Natica largillierti Récluz, 1852

= Bulbus fragilis =

Species of gastropod

Bulbus fragilis is a species of predatory sea snail, a marine gastropod mollusk in the family Naticidae, the moon snails.

== Distribution ==
This marine species was found in Baffin Bay, Canada.
