= Coralliophila nodosa =

Scientific classification
- Kingdom: Animalia
- Phylum: Mollusca
- Class: Gastropoda
- Subclass: Caenogastropoda
- Order: Neogastropoda
- Superfamily: Muricoidea
- Family: Muricidae
- Subfamily: Coralliophilinae
- Genus: Coralliophila
- Species: C. nodosa

Binomial name
- Coralliophila nodosa (A. Adams, 1854)

Synonyms
- Rapana nodosa A. Adams, 1854

Species of gastropod

Coralliophila nodosa is a species of sea snail, a marine gastropod mollusk, in the family Muricidae, the murex snails or rock snails.
