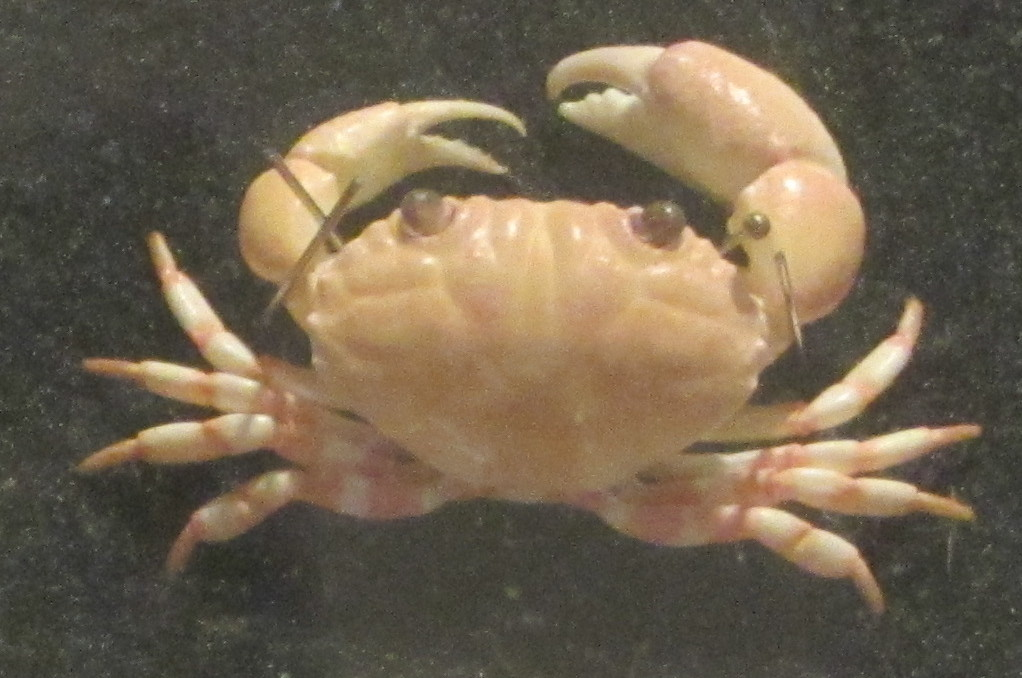
- Lydia annulipes

Scientific classification
- Kingdom: Animalia
- Phylum: Arthropoda
- Class: Malacostraca
- Order: Decapoda
- Suborder: Pleocyemata
- Infraorder: Brachyura
- Family: Oziidae
- Genus: Lydia; Gistel, 1848

= Lydia (crab) =

Genus of crustaceans

Lydia is a genus of crabs in the family Oziidae. The following five species are recognized:

- Lydia annulipes (H.Milne Edwards, 1834)
- Lydia granulosa (A.Milne-Edwards, 1867)
- Lydia kianobesana Hu, 1983
- Lydia tenax (Rüppell, 1830)
- Lydia truncata (Strahl, 1862)
