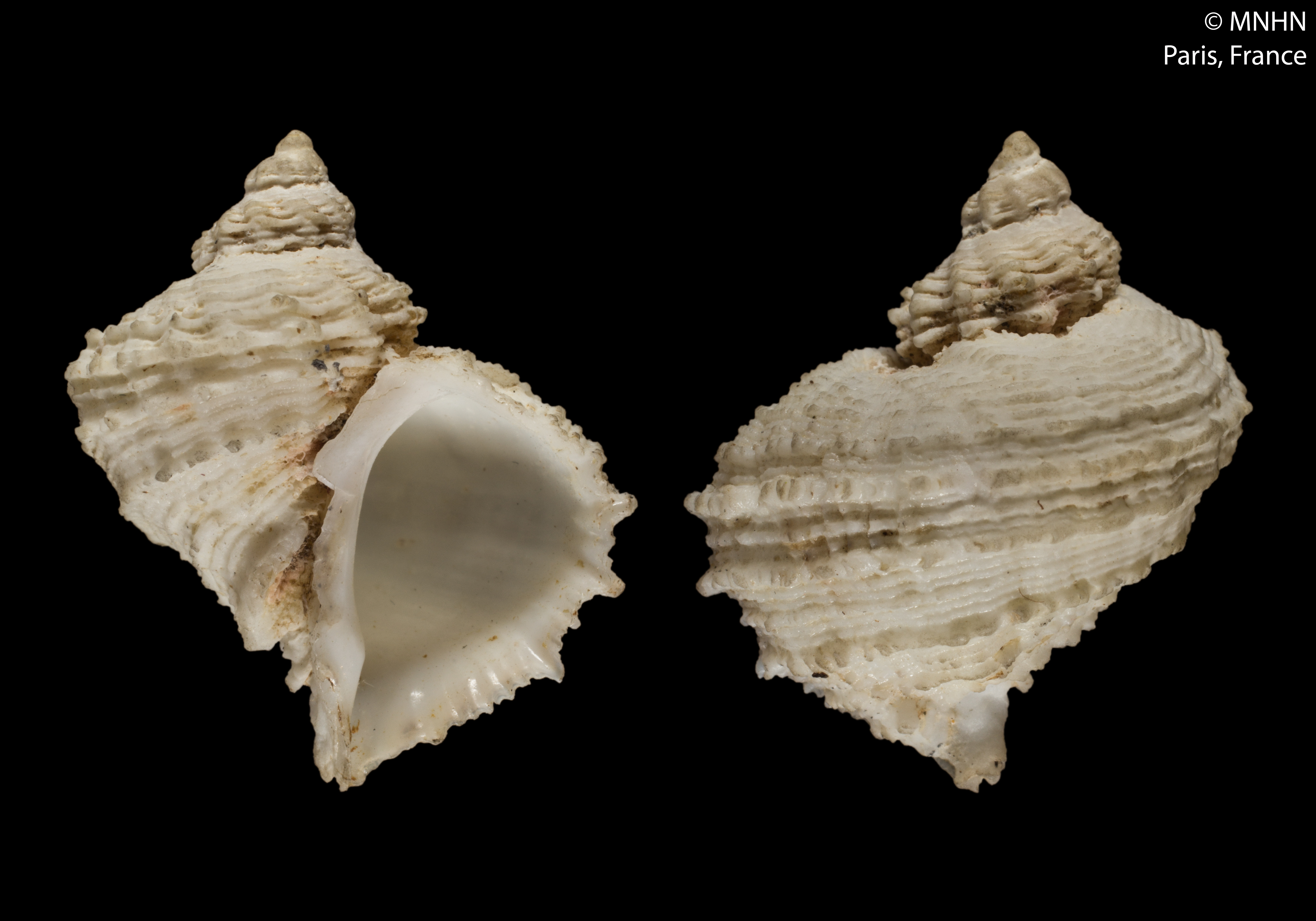
- Coralliophila erosa shell (holotype at MNHN, Paris)

Scientific classification
- Kingdom: Animalia
- Phylum: Mollusca
- Class: Gastropoda
- Subclass: Caenogastropoda
- Order: Neogastropoda
- Family: Muricidae
- Genus: Coralliophila
- Species: C. erosa

Binomial name
- Coralliophila erosa (Röding, 1798)

Synonyms
- Cantharus erosus Röding, 1798 (basionym); Coralliophila (Coralliophila) erosa (Röding, 1798) · accepted, alternate representation; Coralliophila (Liniaxis) groschi Kilburn, 1977 · accepted, alternate representation; Coralliophila abbreviata (Lamarck, 1816); Coralliophila deformis (Lamarck, 1822); Coralliophila groschi Kilburn, 1977; Coralliophila orbignyana (Petit de la Saussaye, 1851); Coralliophila stearnsiana Dall, 1919; Coralliophila suturalis A. Adams in H. Adams & A. Adams, 1853; Murex plicatus W. Wood, 1818; Purpura trichotropoides Montrouzier, R.P. in Souverbie, S.M., 1861; Pyrula abbreviata Lamarck, 1816; Pyrula deformis Lamarck, 1822; Rapana coralliophila A. Adams, 1854; Rapana fragilis A. Adams, 1854; Rapana suturalis A. Adams, 1854; Rhizochilus coralliophila Adams, A., 1854; Rhizochilus exaratus Pease, 1861; Rhizochilus fragilis Adams, A., 1844; Rhizochilus suturalis Adams, A., 1854; Trichotropis dorbignyanum Petit de la Saussaye, 1851

= Coralliophila erosa =

Species of gastropod

Coralliophila erosa is a species of sea snail, a marine gastropod mollusk in the family Muricidae, the murex snails or rock snails.

== Description ==
The shell size varies between 15 mm and 35 mm

== Distribution ==
This marine species occurs in the Red Sea and in the Indian Ocean off Aldabra, Madagascar, the Mascarene Basin and Tanzania; in the Indo-West Pacific.
