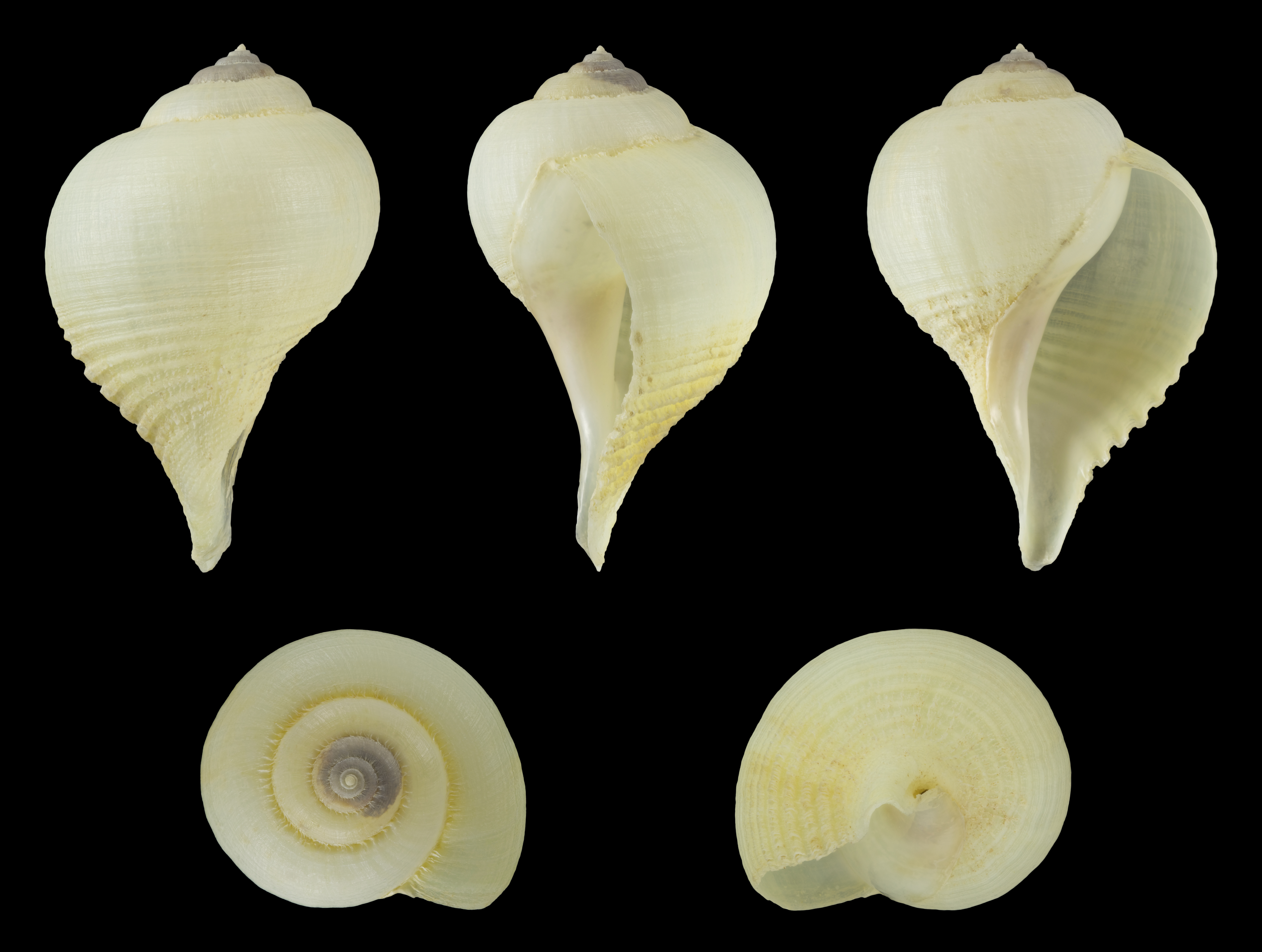

Scientific classification
- Kingdom: Animalia
- Phylum: Mollusca
- Class: Gastropoda
- Subclass: Caenogastropoda
- Order: Neogastropoda
- Superfamily: Muricoidea
- Family: Muricidae
- Subfamily: Coralliophilinae
- Genus: Rapa
- Species: R. incurva

Binomial name
- Rapa incurva (Dunker, 1852)

Synonyms
- Bulbus incurvus Dunker, 1852

= Rapa incurva =

Species of gastropod

Rapa incurva is a species of sea snail, a marine gastropod mollusk, in the family Muricidae, the murex snails or rock snails.

== Distribution ==
This species occurs in Mascarene Basin.
