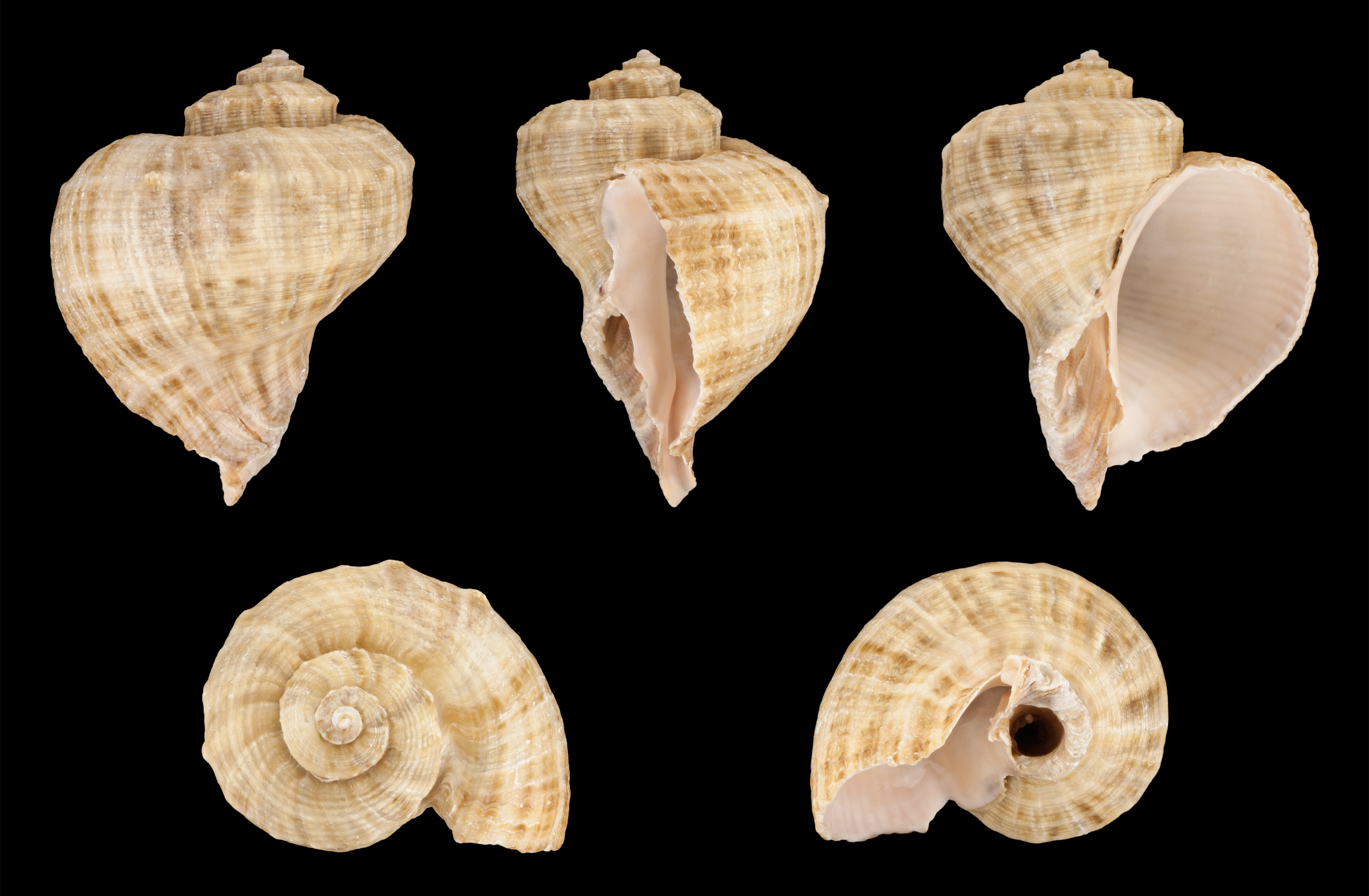

Scientific classification
- Kingdom: Animalia
- Phylum: Mollusca
- Class: Gastropoda
- Subclass: Caenogastropoda
- Order: Neogastropoda
- Family: Muricidae
- Genus: Rapana
- Species: R. rapiformis

Binomial name
- Rapana rapiformis (Born, 1778)

Synonyms
- Buccinum bulbosum Dillwyn, 1817; Murex rapa Gmelin, 1791; Murex rapiformis Born, 1778; Purpura rapa Valenciennes, 1846 · junior subjective synonym; Rapa bulbosa (Dillwyn, 1817); Rapa volema Röding, 1798; Rapana bulbosa (Dillwyn, 1817)

= Rapana rapiformis =

Species of gastropod

Rapana rapiformis is a species of sea snail, a marine gastropod mollusc in the family Muricidae, the murex snails or rock snails.

== Description ==
A distinctive shell, up to 7 cm, with a low spire, a large body whorl and a wide aperture. The spire whorls show deep sutures and moderate-sized tubercles (2-3 rows of tubercles on the body whorl, most prominent on shoulder). The colour of the shell is mottled orange, brown and cream. The aperture is white.

== Distribution ==
This species occurs in deep water on sand in the Western Indian Ocean, the Red Sea to Gulf of Oman
