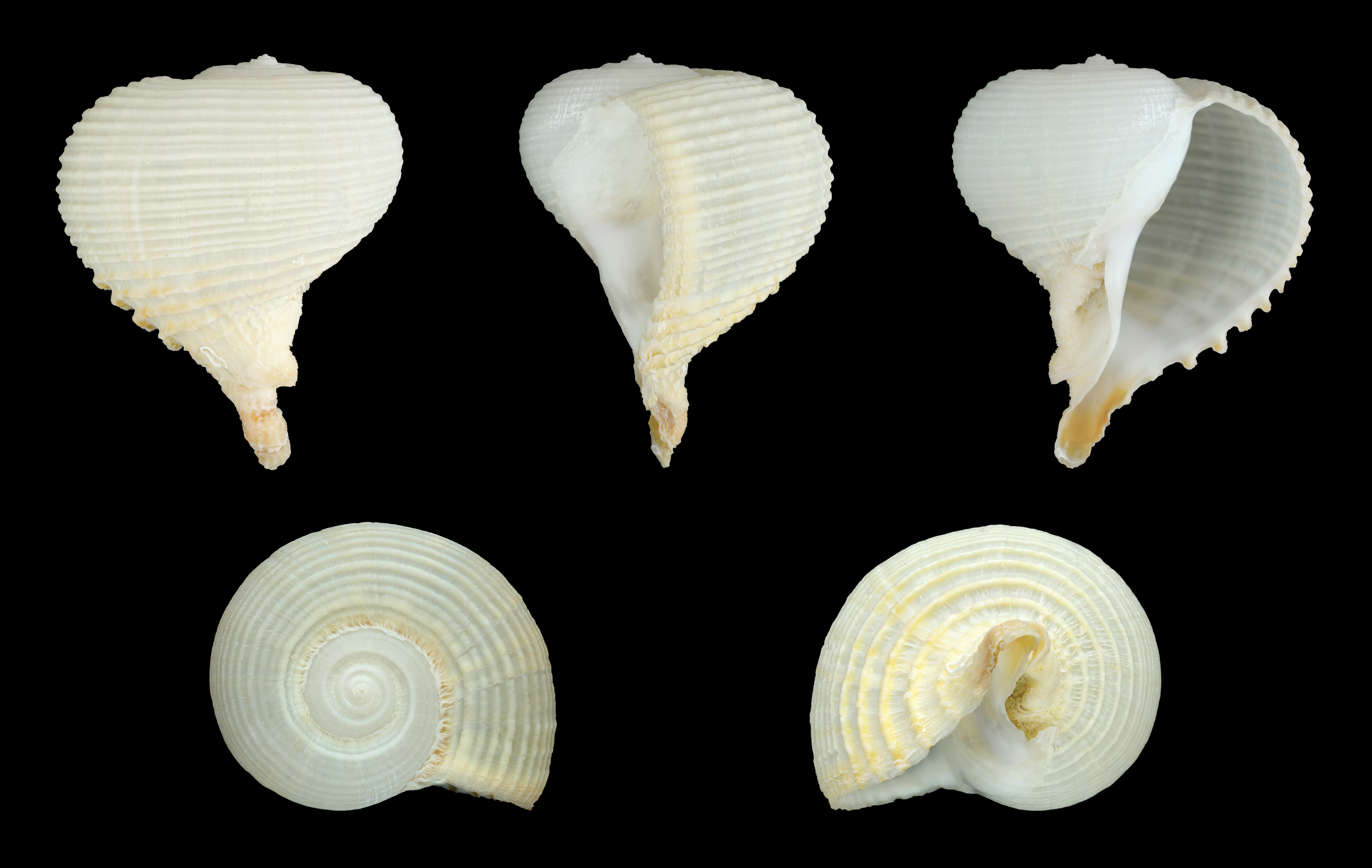

Scientific classification
- Kingdom: Animalia
- Phylum: Mollusca
- Class: Gastropoda
- Subclass: Caenogastropoda
- Order: Neogastropoda
- Family: Muricidae
- Subfamily: Coralliophilinae
- Genus: Rapa
- Species: R. rapa

Binomial name
- Rapa rapa (Linnaeus, 1758)

Synonyms
- Bulla rapa ^{(Linnaeus, 1758)}; Murex rapa Linnaeus, 1758 (original combination); Pyrula papyracea Lamarck, 1816; Rapa papyracea (Lamarck, 1816); Rapa pellucida Röding, 1798; Rapa penardi Montrouzier, 1856; Rapa striata Röding, 1798; Rapa tenuis H. Adams & A. Adams, 1858; Rapana bella G. Nevill & H. Nevill, 1869; Rapana pellucida Bozzetti, 2008

= Rapa rapa =

Species of gastropod

Rapa rapa, common name the bubble turnip, is an operculated species of sea snail, a marine gastropod mollusk in the family Muricidae, the murex snails or rock snails.

== Description ==
Rapa rapa was first described in 1758 by Carl Linnaeus as Murex rapa. Its shell size can range from 40 to 105 mm (1.6 to 4.1 in).

== Distribution ==
Rapa rapa is found near the Indian Ocean in locations such as Madagascar, the Chagos Archipelago, and the coasts of Tanzania, where it was described in 1856 by Xavier Montrouzier as Rapa penardi. It is also found in the east on the coasts of China and the Philippines.
