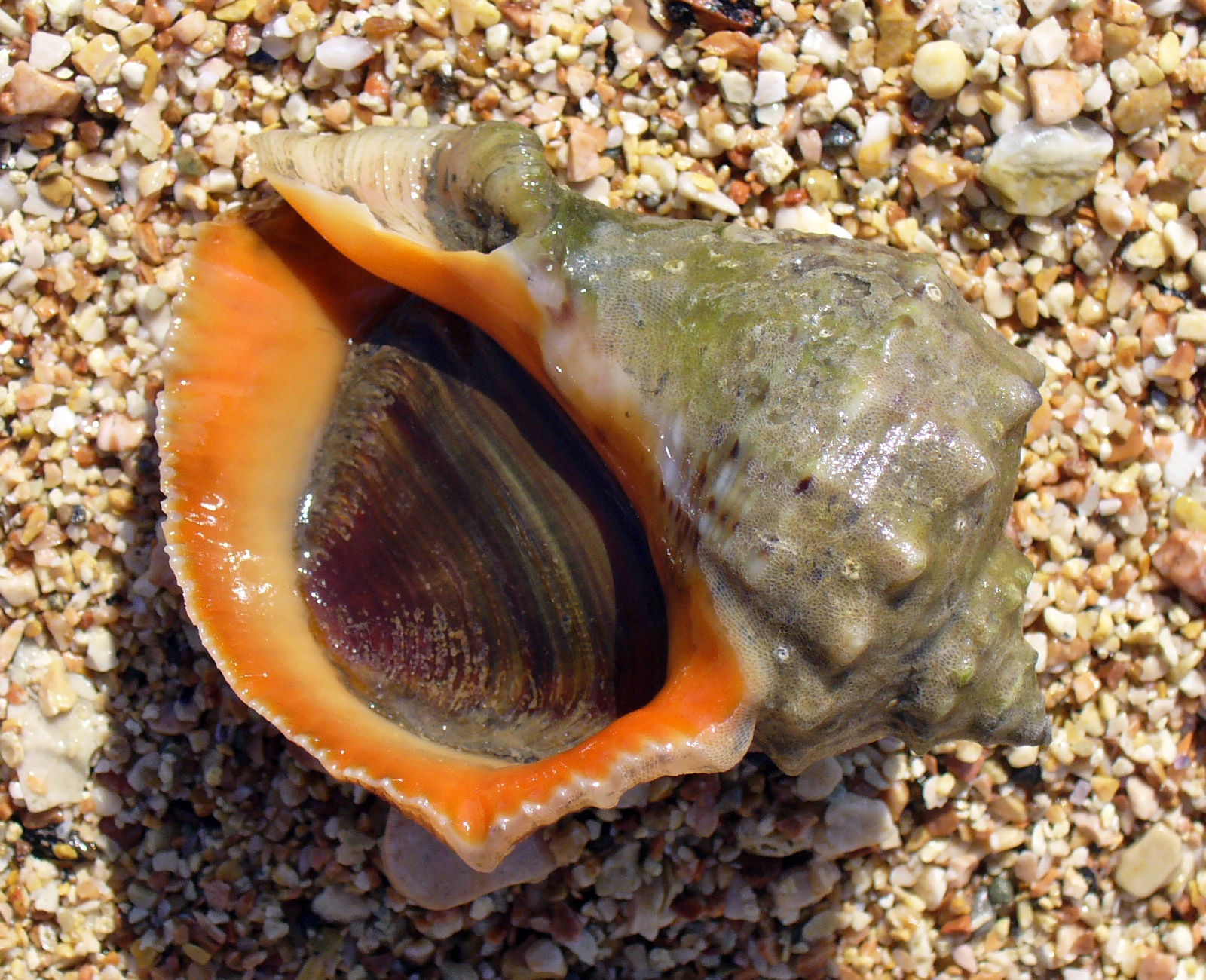
- A live individual of Rapana venosa retracted into the shell, with the operculum closing the aperture
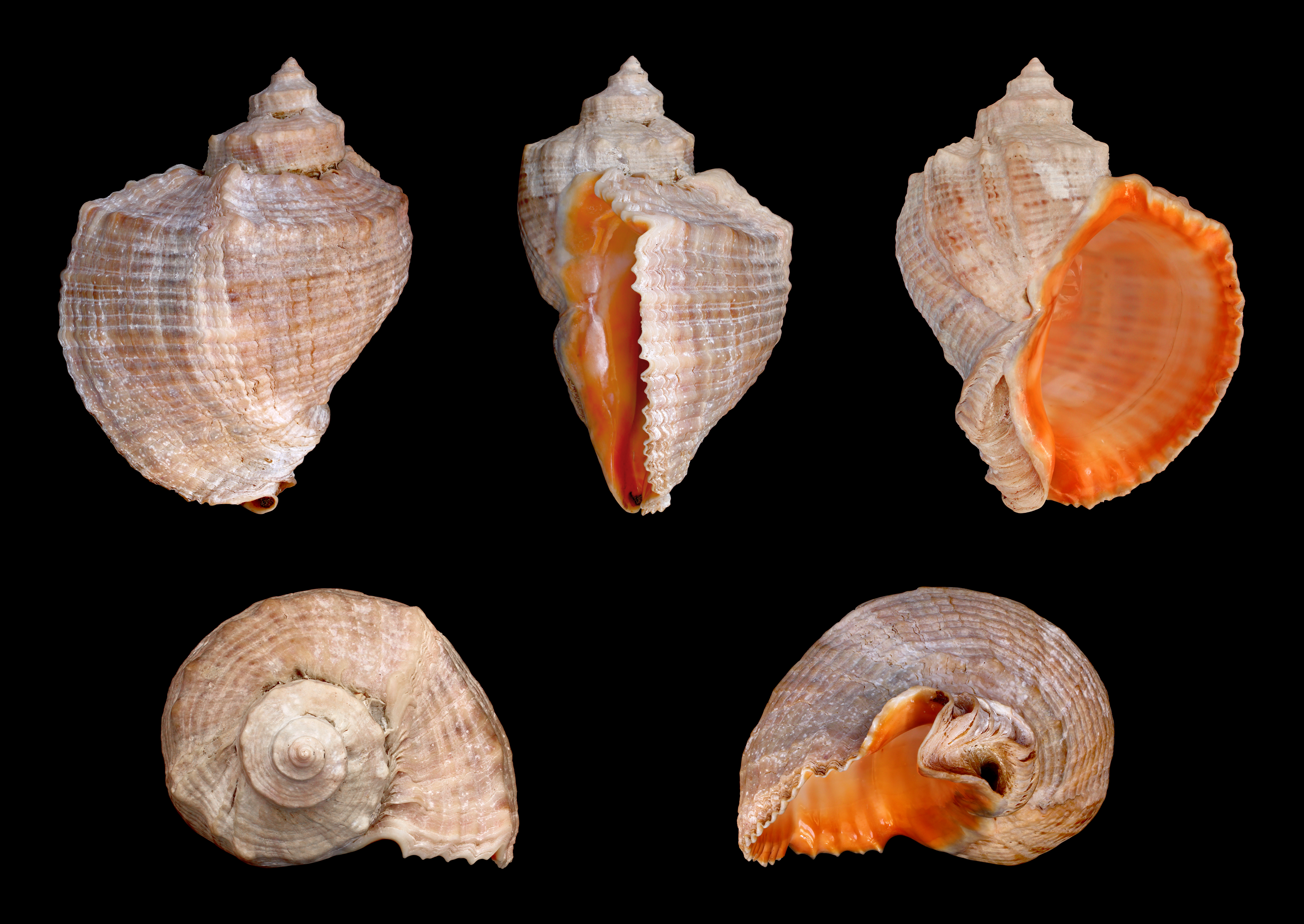
- Five views of a shell of R. venosa

Scientific classification
- Kingdom: Animalia
- Phylum: Mollusca
- Class: Gastropoda
- Subclass: Caenogastropoda
- Order: Neogastropoda
- Family: Muricidae
- Genus: Rapana
- Species: R. venosa

Binomial name
- Rapana venosa (Valenciennes, 1846)

Synonyms
- Purpura venosa Valenciennes, 1846 (basionym); Rapana marginata Valenciennes, 1846; Rapana pechiliensis Grabau & King, 1928; Rapana thomasiana Crosse, 1861

= Rapana venosa =

Species of gastropod

Rapana venosa, common name the veined rapa whelk or Asian rapa whelk, is a species of large predatory sea snail, a marine gastropod mollusc or whelk, in the family Muricidae, the rock shells.

This large sea snail has become an invasive species in many different localities around the world.

== Shell description ==
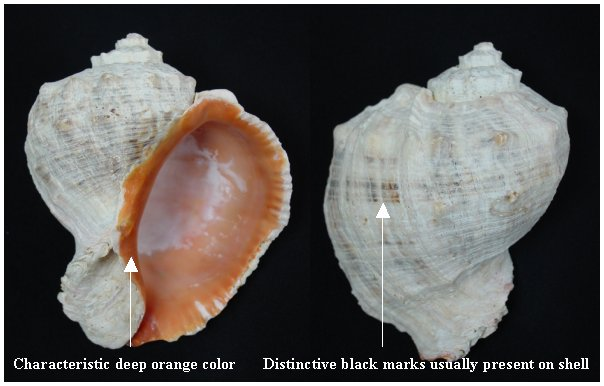
Ventral (left) and dorsal (right) views of a shell of Rapana venosa

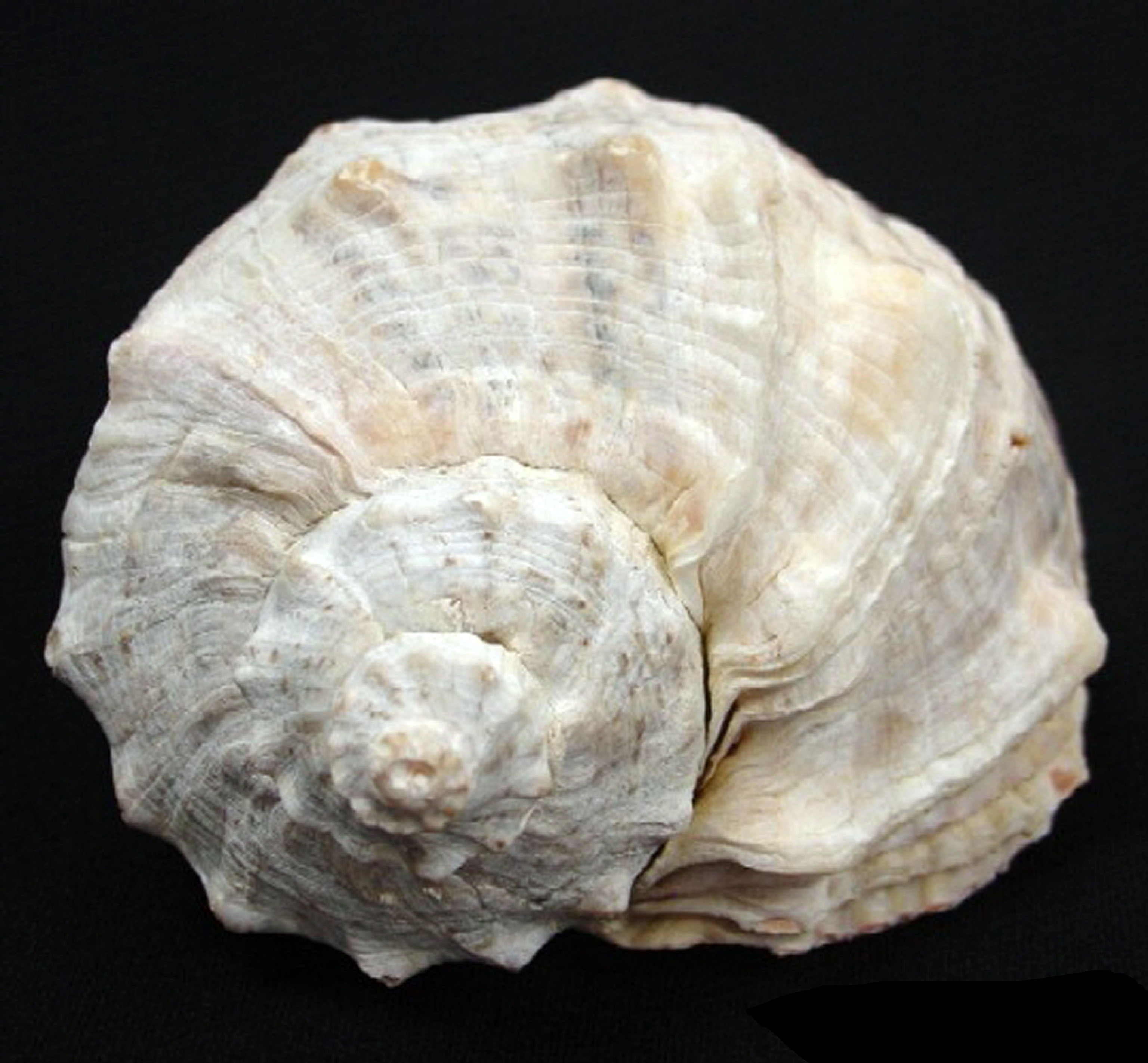
Apical view of the shell of Rapana venosa

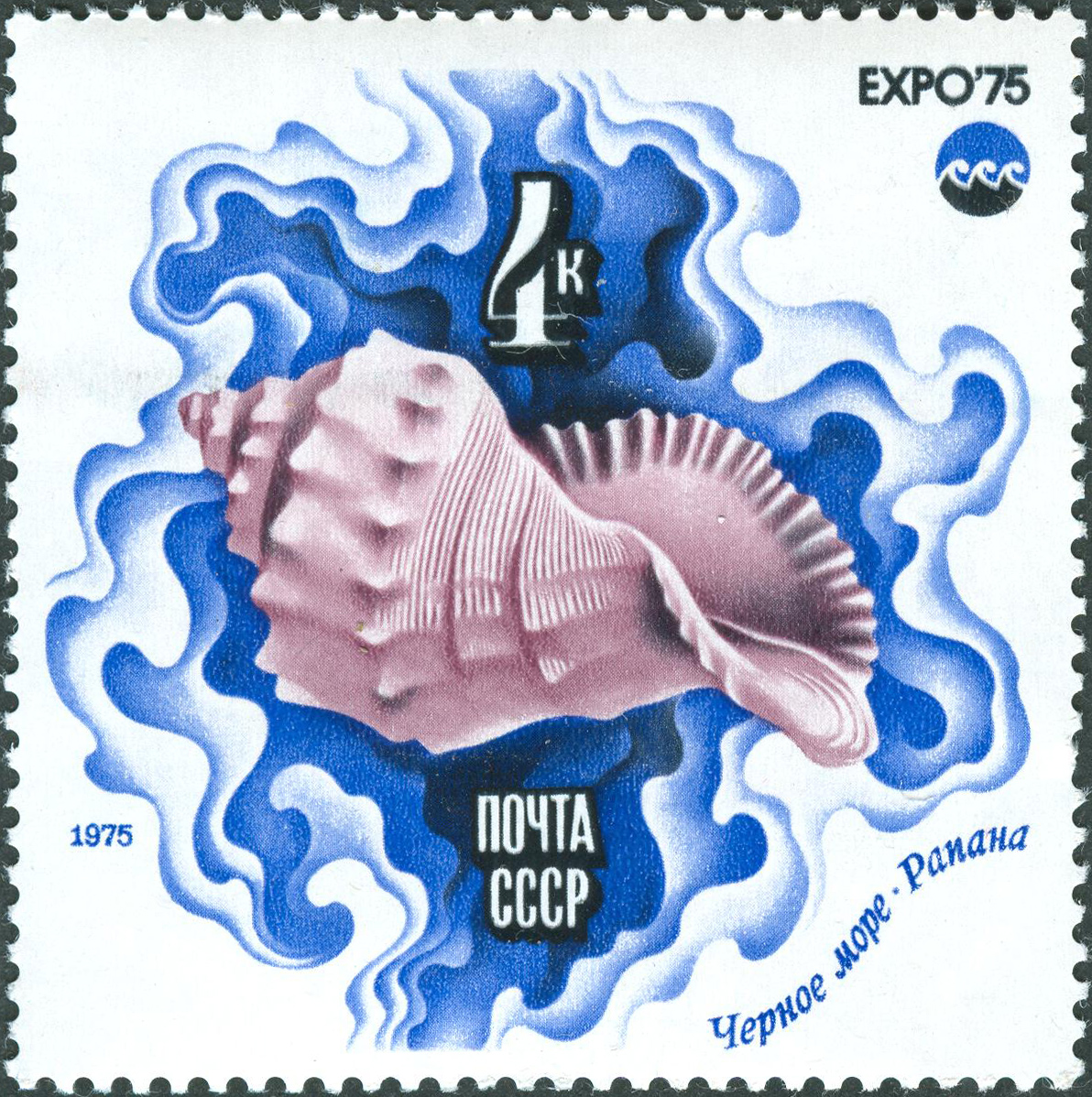
Veined rapa whelk on the stamp of the Soviet Union

The shell of Rapana venosa is globose (rounded) and heavy, possessing a very short spire, a large body whorl, a strong columella and a deep umbilicus. The aperture is large and roughly ovate. Ornamentation is present externally as axial ribs, smooth spiral ribs ending in blunt knobs at both the shoulder and body whorl, and internally as small elongated teeth disposed along the outer lip margin. The external color varies from gray to reddish-brown, with dark brown dashes on the spiral ribs. Some specimens may have distinctive black/dark blue vein-like coloration patterns throughout the inner portions of the shell, usually originating from each individual tooth at the outer lip. A diagnostic feature for this species is the deep orange color found in the aperture and on the columella. The height of the shell can reach up to 180 mm (about 7 in).

== Distribution ==
This species is native to the marine and estuarine waters of the western Pacific, from the Sea of Japan, Yellow Sea, East China Sea and the Bohai Sea.

Rapana venosa is included in Russia's Red Book as threatened with extinction. The original known habitat for this species was the Far East, but since 1947 it has been found in the Black Sea, and its shell became a popular souvenir in Crimea. Recently this species has been found as an exotic in the Chesapeake Bay, on the eastern coast of the United States.

=== Nonindigenous distribution ===
According to some authors, it appears to be the case that the spreading of this species outside its natural range has been made possible by the planktonic larval stage being transported along with ballast water in the hulls of ships, or that egg masses may have been transported with products of marine farming.

Rapa whelks were first found in the Black Sea in the 1940s. Within a decade this mollusk had spread along the Caucasian and Crimean coasts and moved into the Sea of Azov. From 1959 to 1972, its range extended into the northwest Black Sea, to the coastlines of Romania, Bulgaria and Turkey. These whelks have become established in the Adriatic and Aegean seas, and have also been found in the Tyrrhenian Sea, on the Northern Atlantic coast of France, and the southeast coast of South America, in Uruguay and the Rio de La Plata estuary (including Samborombon Bay), and in Argentina. In the United States the first specimen discovered was in August 1998 by members of the Virginia Institute of Marine Science (VIMS) Trawl Survey Group in Hampton Roads, Virginia. The species is now widely distributed and established in Chesapeake Bay.

Rapana venosa is considered among the 100 worst alien species in Europe in the DAISIE European Invasive Alien Species Gateway, one of two marine gastropods on the list. It is considered as about the 52nd the worst alien species in Europe.

== Ecology ==
=== Habitat ===
Veined rapa whelks favor compact sandy bottoms, in which they can burrow almost completely. The native habitat of this species is a region of wide annual temperature ranges, comparable to other localities. Fleeing cold waters in the winter, this species may migrate to warmer, deeper waters, thereby evading cool surface waters. This fertile sea snail is extremely versatile, tolerating low salinities, water pollution and oxygen deficient waters.

=== Feeding habits ===
Veined rapa whelks are carnivorous selective predatory gastropods whose main diet consists of a variety of other mollusk species, mainly epifaunal bivalves such as oysters (Crassostrea virginica) and mussels (Mytilus galloprovincialis, Modiolus and Geukensia), but also clams (Anadara inaequivalvis, Chamelea gallina, Tapes philippinarum, Venus verrucosa, and the northern quahog Mercenaria mercenaria). Prey are chosen by the whelk according to their species and size. Most snails feed by drilling a hole into their bivalve prey, but rapa whelks usually smother their prey by wrapping around the hinged region of the shell and feed by introducing their proboscis between the opened valves. The whelk can also secrete a thick mucus that may or may not contain biotoxins to weaken the prey. Shell drilling, however, is also not unknown in this species.

=== Life cycle ===
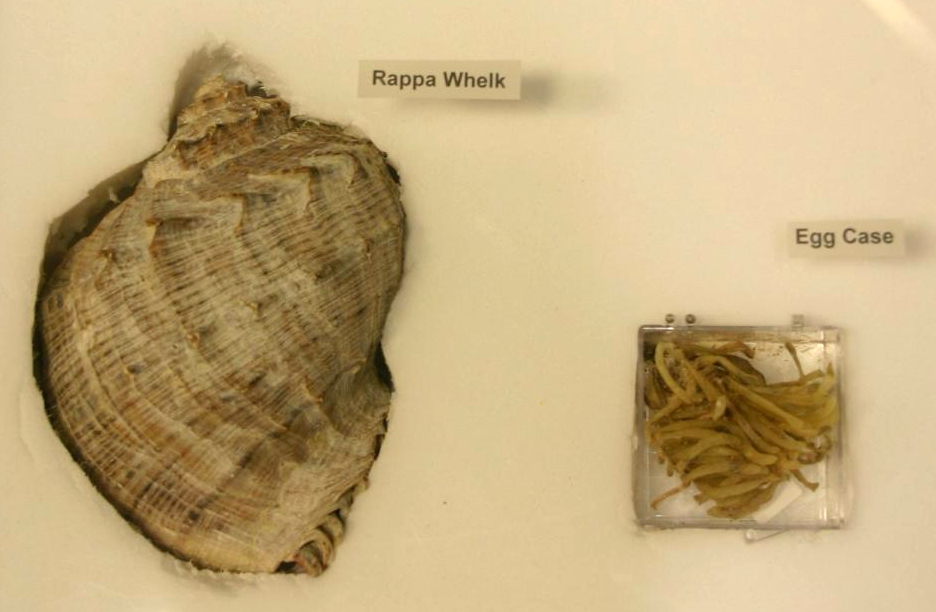
A shell of Veined rapa whelk, side by side with its egg case

Rapana venosa is dioecious, which means each individual organism belonging to this species is distinctly male or female. In this species' native range, mating occurs for extended periods of time, mainly during the winter and spring. It reproduces by internal fertilization, after which it lays clusters of egg cases that resemble small mats of white to yellow shag carpet, mainly during spring and summer. One adult female can lay multiple egg cases throughout the season. Each cluster contains 50-500 egg cases, and each egg case may contain 200-1000 eggs. The pelagic veliger larvae (a larval form common to various marine and fresh-water gastropod and bivalve mollusks) then hatch, persisting in the water column for 14 to 80 days and feeding primarily on plankton. They eventually settle on the ocean floor where they develop into hard-shelled snails. Growth is rapid over the first year of life, and reproduction occurs from the second year onwards. Large specimens may be over ten years old.

=== Reasons for the survival of this invasive species ===
It is known that the abundance of prey, the lack of competition from other gastropod species, as well as the absence of direct predators of R. venosa may be some of the factors that contributed to the successful establishment of new populations of this sea snail outside its native range. The thick strong shell of the rapa whelk is arguably its strongest advantage over native whelks, because rapas can easily prey on local whelks, whereas local whelks are unable to successfully attack rapas. The thick shell also means that predators such as sea turtles are unable to feed on the invasive species, and can only feed on local whelk populations. It is suggested that once the rapa whelk reaches adulthood, it exists unchecked in the local population, and can consume and reproduce freely. The Veined rapa whelk is also highly tolerant to wide variations in salinity and oxygen concentration, a fact that may also help to explain its success as an invader of marine coastal and brackish ecosystems. In its native range Rapana venosa shows high temperature tolerance, being able to withstand temperatures varying from 4 to 27 °C (39.2 - 80.6 °F).

=== Impact of introduction ===
Veined rapa whelks have caused significant changes in the ecology of bottom-dwelling organisms, and have become marine pests in the Black Sea. Although scientists are not completely aware of the impacts of the whelk, they are very concerned about its potential impact on native Bay species. Studies are currently under way to help determine the whelk's spread in Chesapeake Bay, so that scientists can develop a model that will define potential impacts to the Bay's ecosystem.

== Imposex ==
The imposex phenomenon has been observed in the veined rapa whelk in Chesapeake Bay. Imposex is characterized by the development of masculine sexual organs in female individuals as a consequence of exposure to organic tin compounds, such as tributyltin (TBT). Such compounds are biocide and antifouling agents, commonly mixed in paints to prevent marine encrustations on boats and ships. For this reason, it is not uncommon for high concentrations of such compounds to be present in the sea water near shipyards and docking areas, consequently exposing the nearby marine life to its possibly harmful effects. This unnatural development of male reproductive organs, however, has shown no negative effects on populations of this species, and no loss of reproductive capabilities of female R. venosa as a consequence of Imposex has been observed so far.
