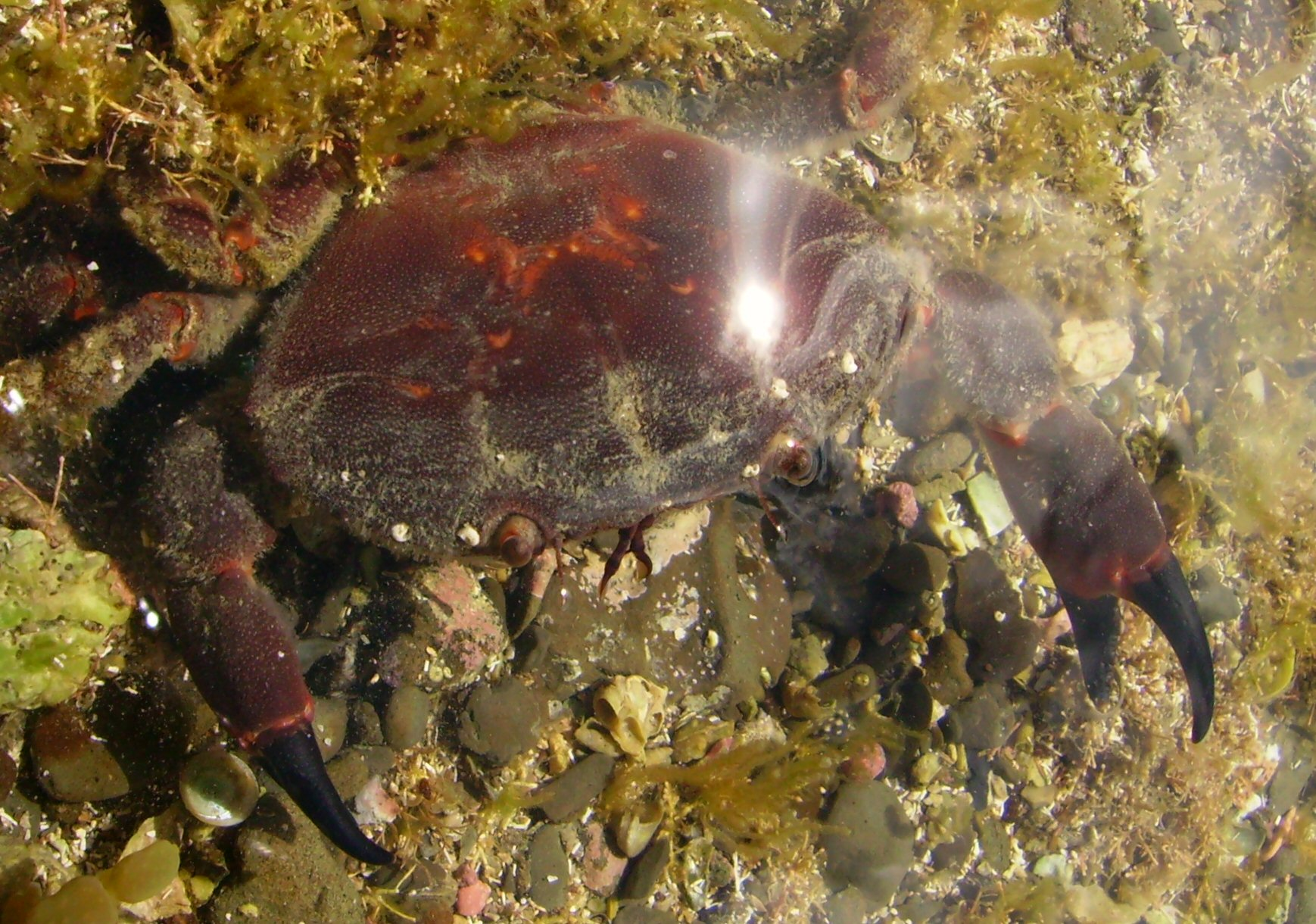
- Ozius truncatus

Scientific classification
- Kingdom: Animalia
- Phylum: Arthropoda
- Class: Malacostraca
- Order: Decapoda
- Suborder: Pleocyemata
- Infraorder: Brachyura
- Section: Eubrachyura
- Subsection: Heterotremata
- Superfamily: Eriphioidea
- Family: Oziidae

= Oziidae =

Family of crabs

Oziidae is a family of crabs in the superfamily Eriphioidea. There are about 7 genera and more than 30 described species in Oziidae.

== Genera ==
These seven genera belong to the family Oziidae:

- Baptozius Alcock, 1898
- Bountiana Davie & Ng, 2000
- Epixanthoides Balss, 1935
- Epixanthus Heller, 1861
- Eupilumnus Kossmann, 1877
- Lydia Gistel, 1848
- Ozius Milne-Edwards, 1834
