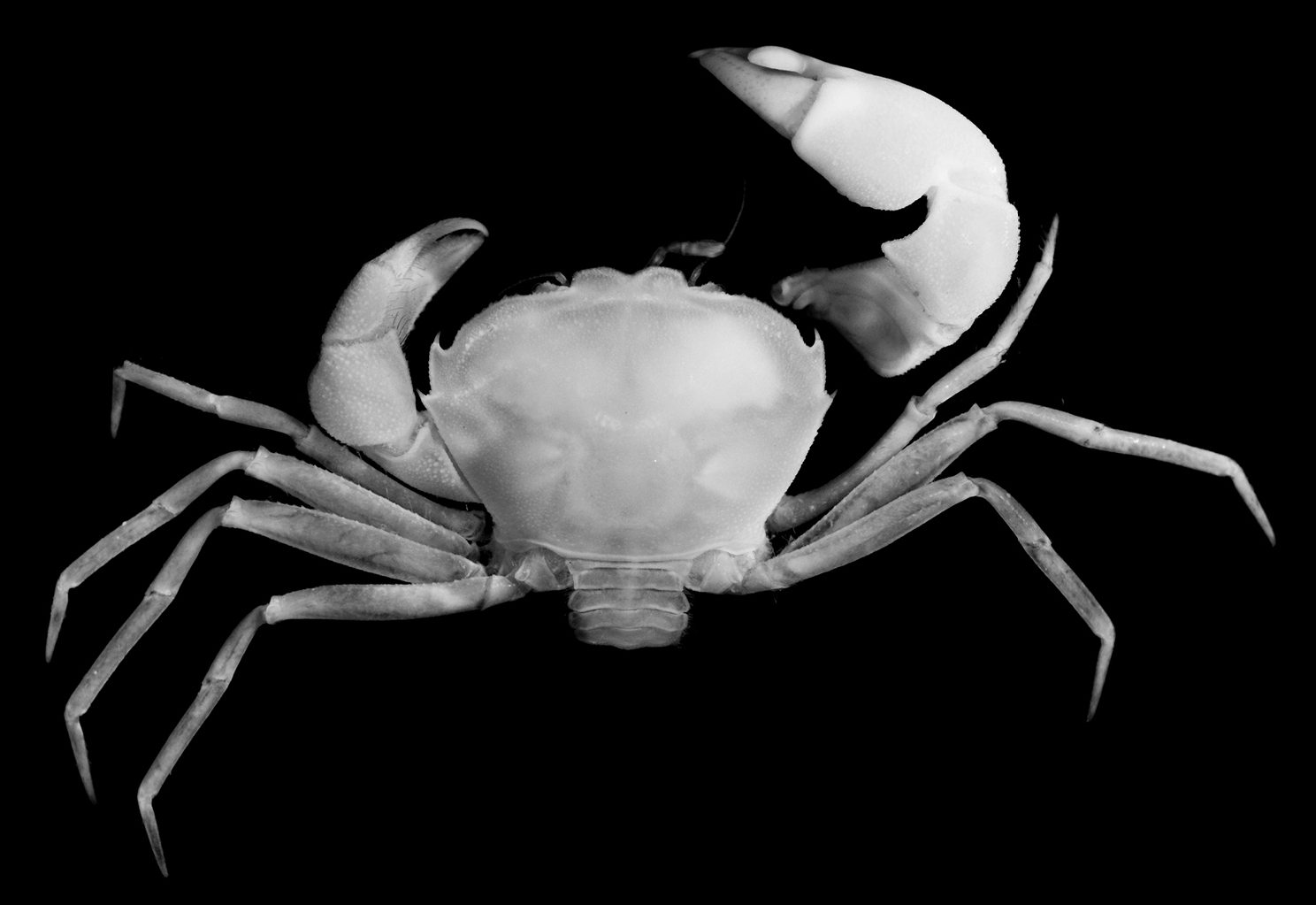
- Harryplax severus

Scientific classification
- Kingdom: Animalia
- Phylum: Arthropoda
- Class: Malacostraca
- Order: Decapoda
- Suborder: Pleocyemata
- Infraorder: Brachyura
- Subsection: Heterotremata
- Superfamily: Pseudozioidea; Alcock, 1898

Families
- Christmaplacidae; Pilumnoididae; Planopilumnidae; Pseudoziidae

= Pseudozioidea =

Pseudozioidea Temporal range: Eocene–Recent

Superfamily of crabs

Pseudozioidea is a superfamily of crabs, formerly treated in the Eriphioidea, Carpilioidea, Xanthoidea, Pilumnoidea and Goneplacoidea. A number of fossils from the Eocene onwards are known from the family Pseudoziidae. Eleven genera are recognised in three families:

- Christmaplacidae Naruse & Ng, 2014
  - Christmaplax Naruse & Ng, 2014
  - Harryplax Mendoza & Ng, 2017
- Pilumnoididae Guinot & Macpherson, 1987
  - Pilumnoides Lucas, 1844
  - Setozius Ng & Ahyong, 2013
- Planopilumnidae Serène, 1984
  - Flindersoplax Davie, 1989
  - Haemocinus Ng, 2003
  - Planopilumnus Balss, 1933
  - Platychelonion Crosnier & Guinot, 1969
  - Rathbunaria Ward, 1933
- Pseudoziidae Alcock, 1898
  - Archaeozius † Schweitzer, 2003
  - Euryozius Miers, 1886
  - Flindersoplax Davie, 1989
  - Priabonocarcinus † Müller & Collins, 1991
  - Pseudozius Dana, 1851
  - Santeexanthus † Blow & Manning, 1996
  - Tongapapaka † Feldmann, Schweitzer & McLaughlin, 2006
