= Stone crab =

Stone crab may refer to:

== Brachyura (true crabs) ==
- Cuban stone crab (Menippe nodifrons)
- Florida stone crab (Menippe mercenaria)
- Gulf stone crab (Menippe adina)

== Anomura ==
- Hairy stone crab (Lomis hirta), the only member of the family Lomisidae
- King crab, crustaceans of the family Lithodidae
