= Touch pool =

Aquarium tank allowing visitors to touch wildlife

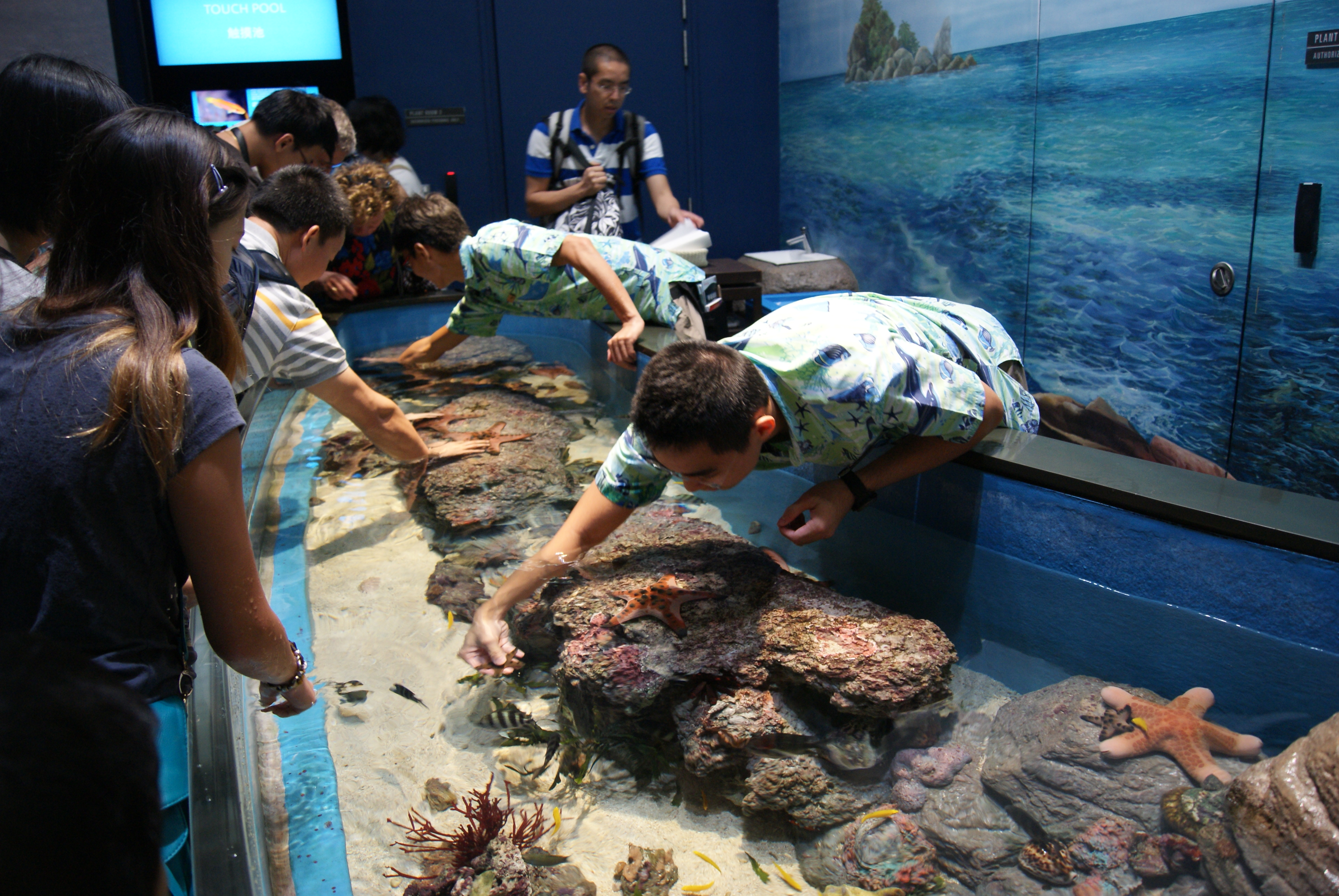
A touch pool at the S.E.A. Aquarium in Singapore. Visitors are allowed to touch a limited amount of the fish in the tank.

A touch pool or touch tank is a type of aquarium attraction in public aquariums where members of the public, especially young people, are allowed to touch the wildlife within the tanks. Tanks will be stocked with species which are not dangerous to touch to provide an opportunity for individuals to learn more about those species. These can include species like blue crabs, hermit crabs, stone crabs, sea snails and even sea anemone. Tanks are good for discussion and learning opportunities for children and family, helping with ecological education and understanding of ecosystems.

Typical species in installations include rays, catsharks, flatfish, starfish, sea urchins, crabs, molluscs and other shellfish.

Touch pools have been critiqued for how sanitary they are: humans are often touching the protective mucus of the fish and other wildlife in the tank, leading to potential health complications. Other critiques include the quality of life for the organisms in the tank, and the lack of mimicry of real aquatic environments. Other researchers have evaluated the elevated risk of health impacts for humans who interact with the animals, through potential health concerns.

== See also ==
- Shark tunnel
