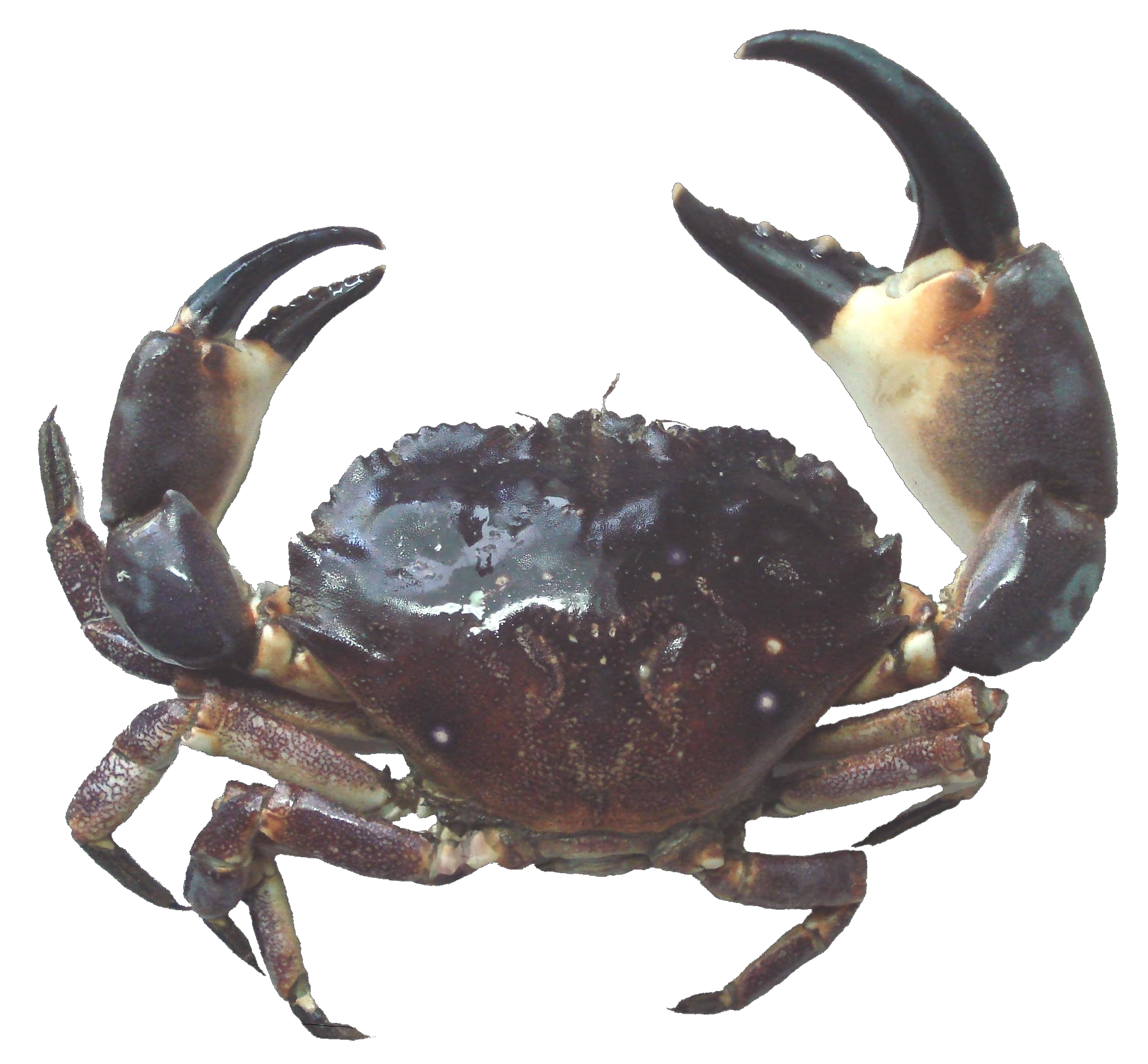
- Platyxanthus crenulatus

Scientific classification
- Kingdom: Animalia
- Phylum: Arthropoda
- Clade: Pancrustacea
- Class: Malacostraca
- Order: Decapoda
- Suborder: Pleocyemata
- Infraorder: Brachyura
- Section: Eubrachyura
- Subsection: Heterotremata
- Superfamily: Eriphioidea
- Family: Platyxanthidae
- Genus: Platyxanthus; A. Milne-Edwards, 1863

= Platyxanthus =

Genus of crabs

Platyxanthus is a genus of crabs in the family Platyxanthidae, containing the following species:

- Platyxanthus balboai Garth, 1940
- Platyxanthus crenulatus A. Milne-Edwards, 1879
- Platyxanthus orbignyi (H. Milne Edwards & Lucas, 1843)
- Platyxanthus patagonicus A. Milne-Edwards, 1879
