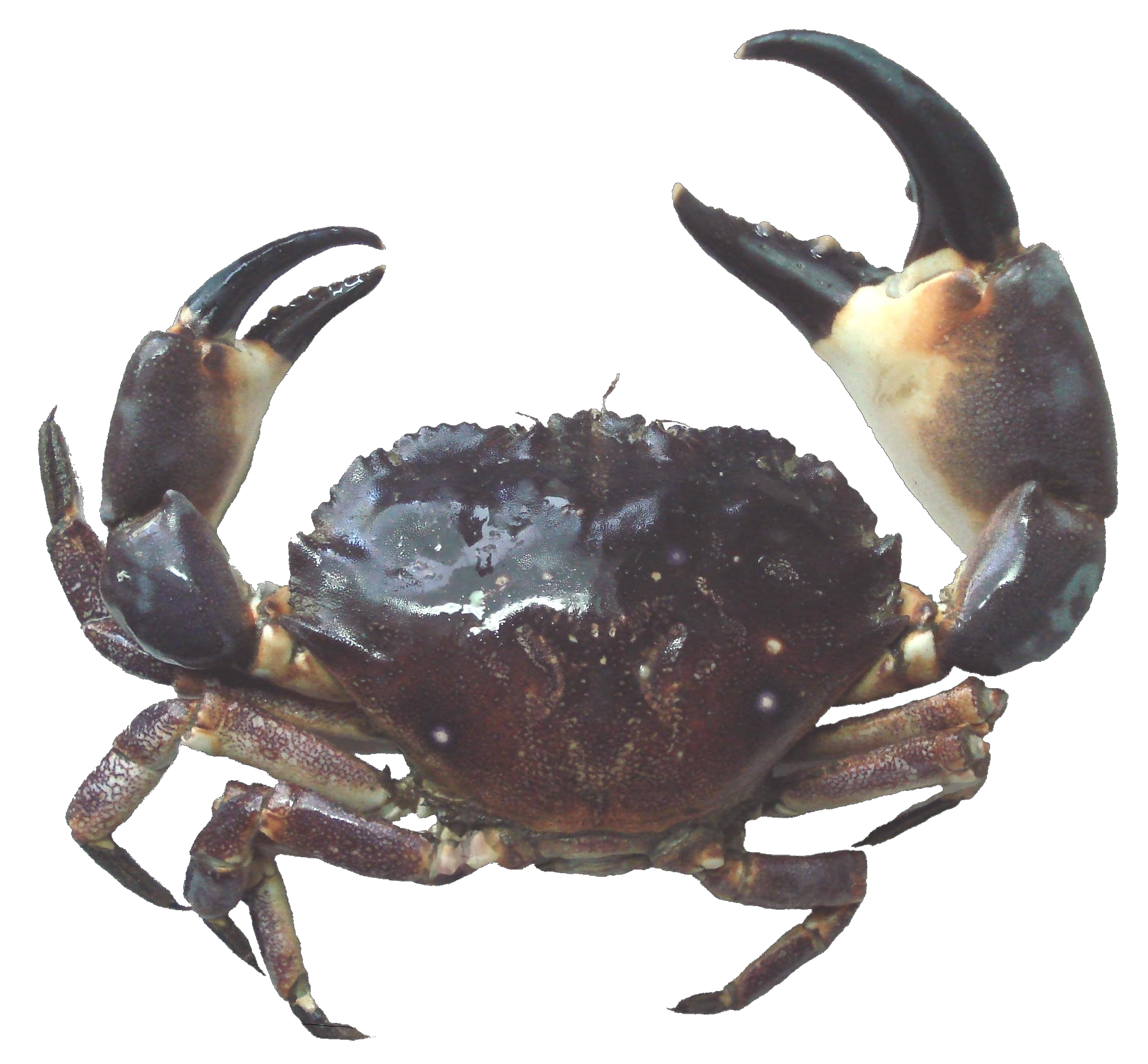

Scientific classification
- Kingdom: Animalia
- Phylum: Arthropoda
- Clade: Pancrustacea
- Class: Malacostraca
- Order: Decapoda
- Suborder: Pleocyemata
- Infraorder: Brachyura
- Family: Platyxanthidae
- Genus: Platyxanthus
- Species: P. crenulatus

Binomial name
- Platyxanthus crenulatus A. Milne-Edwards, 1879

= Platyxanthus crenulatus =

Species of crab

Platyxanthus crenulatus is a species of crab in the family Platyxanthidae. The species is found along the sublittoral zone of the western Atlantic in the waters of Brazil, Uruguay and Argentina, associated mostly with hard bottoms. Adults are robust and conspicuous crabs, with a smooth carapace, dorsally purple and white ventrally. Their claws have marked heterochely and right-handedness (i.e. dimorphism between chelae and the tendency of bearing the major claw on the right-hand side of the body), traits associated with shell-breaking feeding habits. Due to its abundance, large size and diet, P. crenulatus presumably has an important ecological role as a predator in benthic communities.
