= Pilumnoides inglei =

Scientific classification
- Kingdom: Animalia
- Phylum: Arthropoda
- Class: Malacostraca
- Order: Decapoda
- Suborder: Pleocyemata
- Infraorder: Brachyura
- Family: Pilumnoididae
- Genus: Pilumnoides
- Species: P. inglei

Binomial name
- Pilumnoides inglei Guinot & Macpherson, 1987

Species of crab

Pilumnoides inglei is a species of crab, known only from a few specimens collected on derelict boats on the south coast of England.

== Taxonomy ==
Pilumnoides inglei was described in 1987 during a revision of the genus Pilumnoides by Danièle Guinot and Enrique Macpherson. It was named after Ray W. Ingle, who worked at the Natural History Museum and wrote the important book British Crabs.

== Description ==
Although Pilumnoides inglei resembles P. perlatus very closely, the carapace and chelae (claws) of P. inglei are smoother than in P. perlatus. The known adult specimens vary in size from 5.5 by 6.7 millimetres (0.22 in × 0.26 in) to 11.3 mm × 14.3 mm (0.44 in × 0.56 in).

== Collections ==
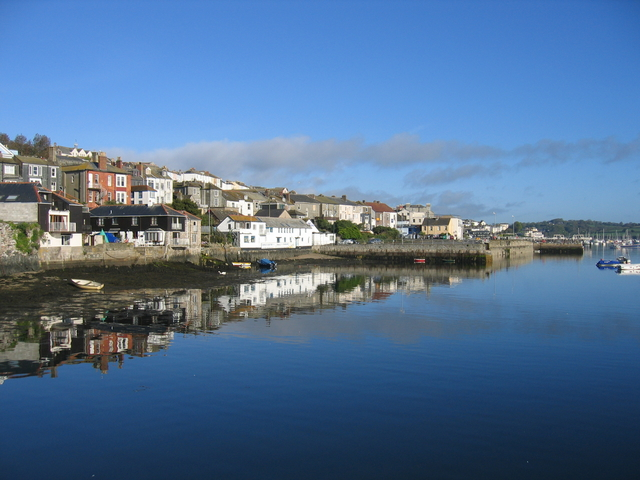
The first specimens of Pilumnoides inglei were collected by Rupert Vallentin from a derelict ship in Falmouth Harbour.

In 1900, Rupert Vallentin recorded specimens of Pilumnoides on a derelict ship in Falmouth harbour, Cornwall. The ship was the 500-ton Liverpool barque Ruthen, carrying a consignment of guano from the Patagonian island of Lobos (45°4′1.5″S 66°19′19.4″W), "about mid-way between Montividio [Montevideo] and the Straits of Magellan". The ship was severely damaged in a gale off the Isles of Scilly, and was towed to Falmouth, where Vallentin found numerous Pilumnoides crabs among the dense seaweed on the ship's hull. Despite his attempts to introduce a new species to the area, by dispersing crabs about the harbour, the population did not persist. Vallentin sent some of the specimens he had collected to Reginald Innes Pocock at the British Museum (now the Natural History Museum), who identified them as Pilumnoides perlatus.

Further specimens were collected by G. W. Dock from the vessel Micfield at Plymouth in 1913. Since 1913, no further specimens have been found.

== Distribution ==
While the majority of Pilumnoides species occur around the Americas, Pilumnoides inglei is only known from a few specimens collected on the south coast of England. Prior to 1987, specimens of Pilumnoides found in the British Isles had been identified as Pilumnoides perlatus, a species native to the Pacific coasts of South America. These specimens were thought to have been introduced by ships trading between South America and Europe.

In their 1987 revision, Guinot and Macpherson separated the English specimens as a new species, and reappraised the hypotheses about its natural range. They concluded that the species had never been found in its natural habitat, but expected that the natural habitat would be located off the coast of England, and in the seas of northern Europe, rather than further afield. Similarly, Guinot and Macpherson described the new species Pilumnoides rubus for specimens from South Africa, which were previously thought to be an introduced population of P. perlatus.
