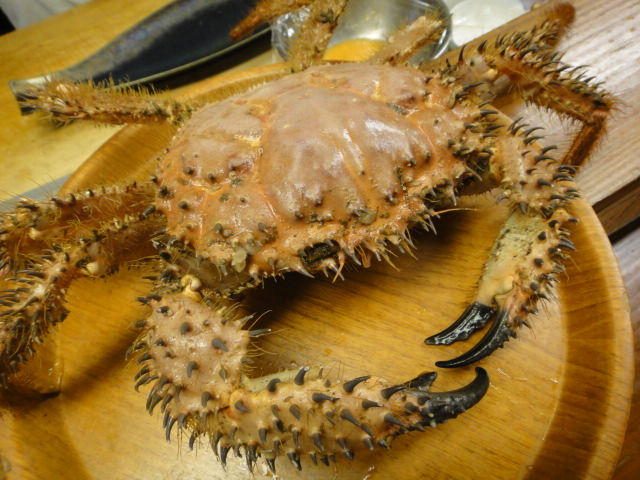
- Hypothalassia armata

Scientific classification
- Domain: Eukaryota
- Kingdom: Animalia
- Phylum: Arthropoda
- Class: Malacostraca
- Order: Decapoda
- Suborder: Pleocyemata
- Infraorder: Brachyura
- Section: Eubrachyura
- Subsection: Heterotremata
- Superfamily: Eriphioidea
- Family: Hypothalassiidae; Karasawa & Schweitzer, 2006
- Genus: Hypothalassia; Gistel, 1848

= Hypothalassia =

Genus of crabs

Hypothalassia is a genus of temperate and tropical deep sea crabs that are found in both Australian and Japanese waters. It comprises two species: Hypothalassia acerba Koh & Ng, 2000, and Hypothalassia armata (De Haan, 1835), both known as the champagne crab.
