= Hypothalassia acerba =

Scientific classification
- Kingdom: Animalia
- Phylum: Arthropoda
- Class: Malacostraca
- Order: Decapoda
- Suborder: Pleocyemata
- Infraorder: Brachyura
- Family: Hypothalassiidae
- Genus: Hypothalassia
- Species: H. acerba

Binomial name
- Hypothalassia acerba Koh & Ng, 2000

Species of crab

Hypothalassia acerba is a large crab found in the muddy substrates of the deep seas off the southwestern Australian and New Zealand coasts. Australian distribution, which is correlated to depth and temperature, ranges from a latitude as far north as approximately 27° S on the west coast, southwards, then eastwards on the south coast to a longitude of at least 129° E. The species usually occurs in waters with temperatures of 13–19 °C (55–66 °F) and in depths ranging of 200–255 metres (656–837 ft) on the lower west coast and 90–200 m (300–660 ft) on the south coast. Body size is inversely related to depth of water. There are only two species in the genus Hypothalassia, and H. acerba is not the same champagne crab as the other Hypothalassia species, H. armata, which is found in Japanese waters.

== Description ==
The species has well-defined groves on a hexagonal carapace, with a smooth dorsal surface and a spiny anterior surface. Carapace width is 150 mm. Their branchial openings are partially covered by maxillipeds, and have asymmetrical chelipeds with stiff, brown-black spines of various sizes on their walking legs. The frontal region is beige-cream and covered in many short setae. Walking legs have a dactylus of 3.7–4.3 times as long as wide.

== Ecology ==
Although life history is not very well known, some data has been collected on reproduction. Hypothalassia acerba reproduction is highly correlated with seasons, due to water temperature fluctuations. Oviposition primarily occurs in the summer between January and March. Females have a tendency to migrate from the south coast eastwards and then northwards to spawn on the lower west coast. The fecundity of this species may be due to its relatively short breeding season, therefore adapting to optimize egg production. Hall et al. (2004) propose that the larvae of this species is planktonic, and is therefore probably carried away from the lower west coast by the Leeuwin Current.

Negligible reproduction occurs on the south coast, where maturity is delayed.

== Capture ==
Hypothalassia acerba was first discovered to have a fishery potential in 1966. Most Hypothalassia acerba are primarily exported to the Chinese market. They are fished using baited traps placed at water depths of 150–360 m (490–1,180 ft) in southern and western waters off the coast of Australia.

Females with eggs are strictly prohibited from fishing. Females have a tendency to be smaller than males, and thus males are more prevalent in catches than females. Fifty percent size at sexual maturity has been estimated at 83.1 mm (3.27 in) and is therefore used as the minimum catch size to aid in sustainable stock levels. This estimation may be considerably underestimated due to fishing biases.

Between the years 1997 and 1999, champagne crab catch rates escalated to between 30 and 45 tonnes. After the year 2000, stocks dropped to negligible levels which was partially due to a decline in stock as well as a greater demand for another deep-sea crab, Chaceon bicolor. Therefore, management of champagne crabs is now primarily focused on safeguarding the biological sustainability of H. acerba and maintaining breeding stocks rather than establishing a viable commercial fishery on the west coast.
