= Planopilumnidae =

Scientific classification
- Kingdom: Animalia
- Phylum: Arthropoda
- Class: Malacostraca
- Order: Decapoda
- Suborder: Pleocyemata
- Infraorder: Brachyura
- Superfamily: Pseudozioidea
- Family: Planopilumnidae

Family of crabs

Planopilumnidae is a family of crabs belonging to the superfamily Pseudozioidea.

== Genera ==
The family contains five genera:

- Flindersoplax Davie, 1989
- Haemocinus P.K.L.Ng, 2003
- Planopilumnus Balss, 1933
- Platychelonion Crosnier & Guinot, 1969
- Rathbunaria Ward, 1933
