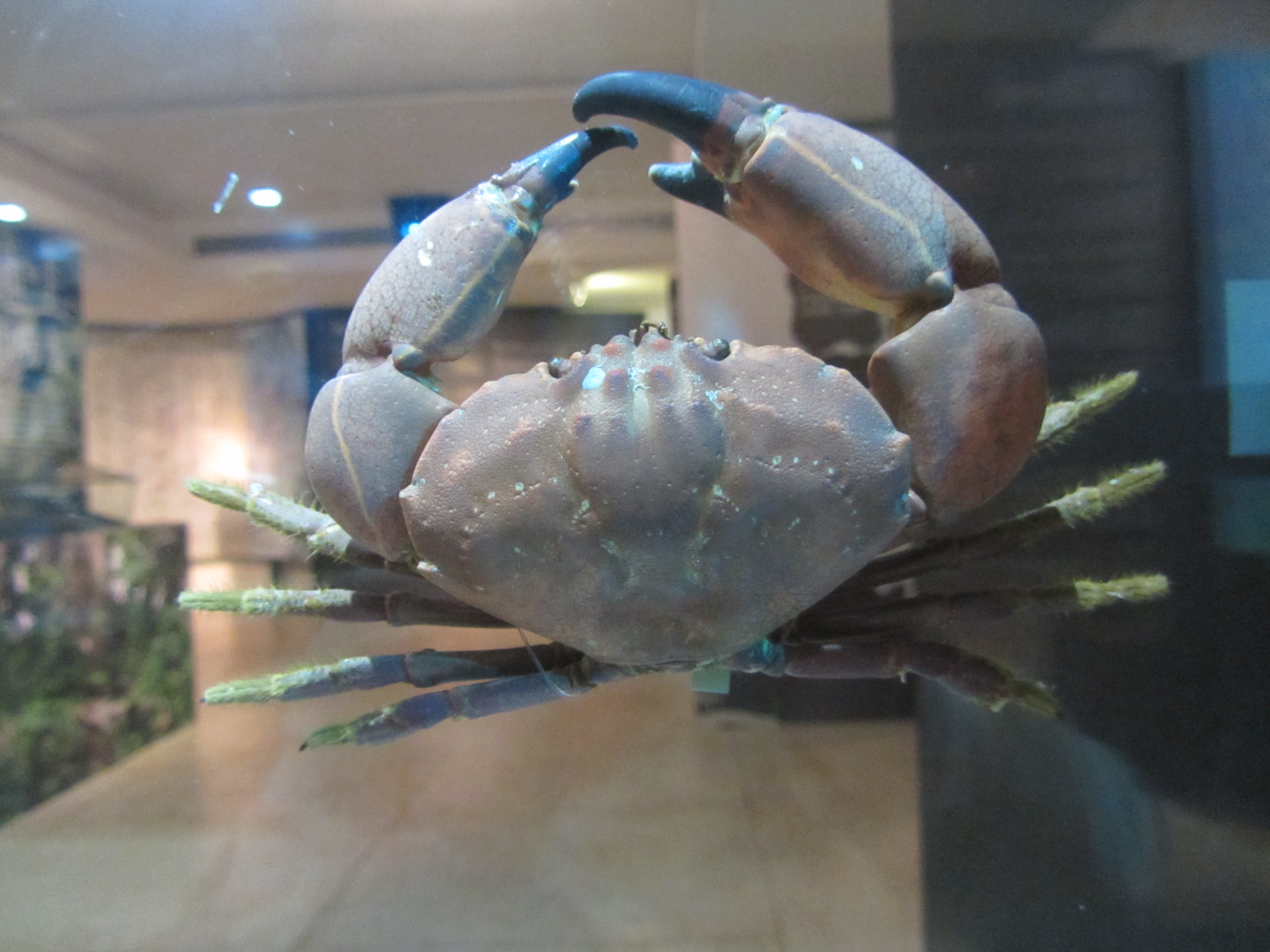

Scientific classification
- Kingdom: Animalia
- Phylum: Arthropoda
- Clade: Pancrustacea
- Class: Malacostraca
- Order: Decapoda
- Suborder: Pleocyemata
- Infraorder: Brachyura
- Family: Menippidae
- Genus: Menippe
- Species: M. rumphii

Binomial name
- Menippe rumphii (Fabricius, 1798)

Synonyms
- Pseudocarcinus bellangerii H. Milne-Edwards, 1834

= Menippe rumphii =

Species of crab

Menippe rumphii is a species of crab in the family Menippidae. It can be found in the Pacific Ocean from Taiwan to Indonesia.
