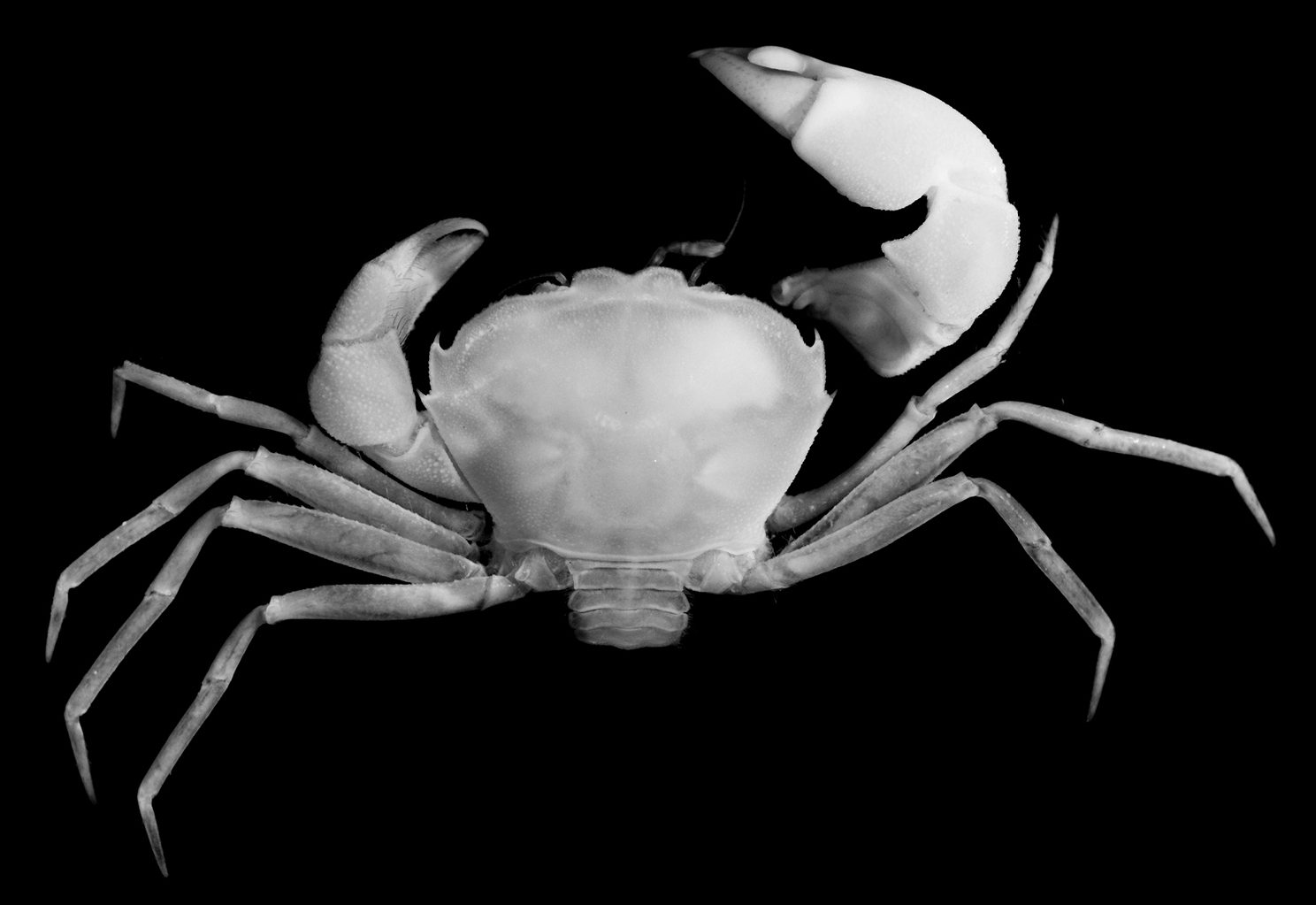
- Harryplax severus

Scientific classification
- Kingdom: Animalia
- Phylum: Arthropoda
- Class: Malacostraca
- Order: Decapoda
- Suborder: Pleocyemata
- Infraorder: Brachyura
- Superfamily: Pseudozioidea
- Family: Christmaplacidae; Naruse & Ng, 2014

Genera
- Christmaplax; Harryplax

= Christmaplacidae =

Family of crab

Christmaplacidae is a family of crab in the superfamily Pseudozioidea containing the species Christmaplax mirabilis from Christmas Island, Australia, and Harryplax severus from Guam.
