= Dairoides =

Scientific classification
- Domain: Eukaryota
- Kingdom: Animalia
- Phylum: Arthropoda
- Class: Malacostraca
- Order: Decapoda
- Suborder: Pleocyemata
- Infraorder: Brachyura
- Section: Eubrachyura
- Subsection: Heterotremata
- Superfamily: Eriphioidea
- Family: Dairoididae; Števčić, 2005
- Genus: Dairoides; Stebbing, 1920

Genus of crabs

Dairoides is a genus of crabs belonging to the monotypic family Dairoididae.

The species of this genus are found in Southern Africa and Pacific Ocean.

Species:

- Dairoides kusei (Sakai, 1938)
- Dairoides margaritatus Stebbing, 1920
- Dairoides seafdeci Takeda & Ananpongsuk, 1991
