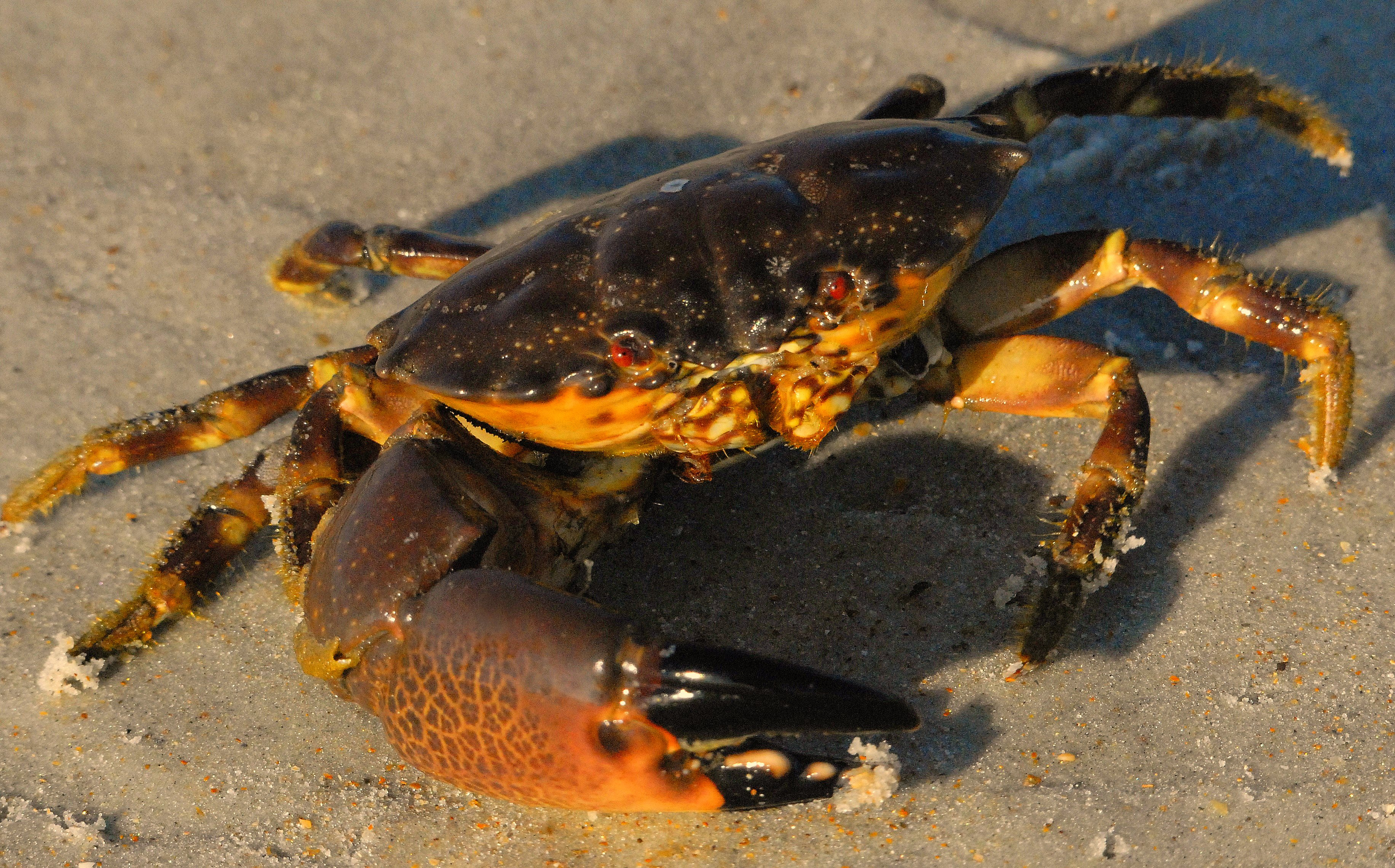

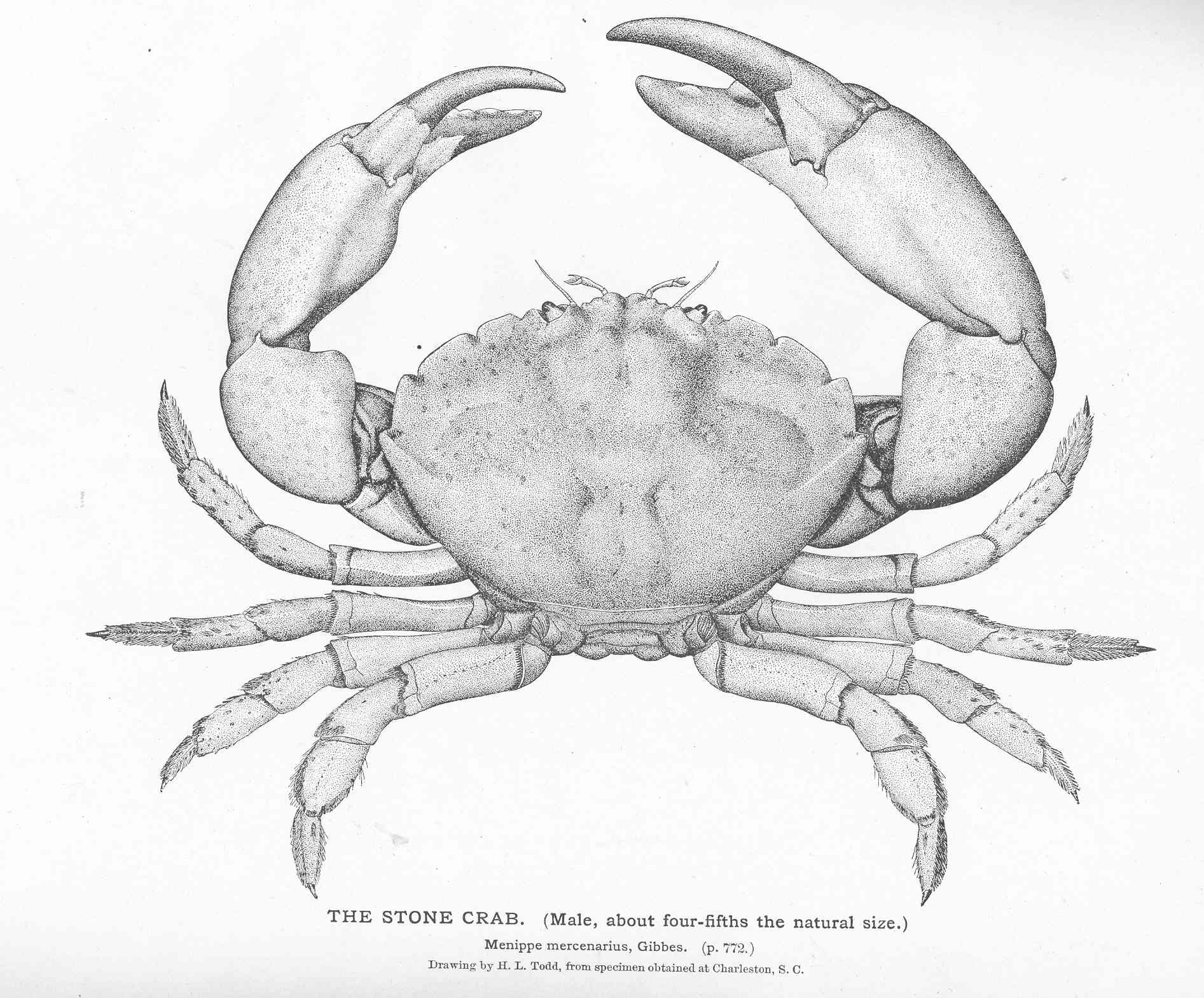
- Male

Scientific classification
- Kingdom: Animalia
- Phylum: Arthropoda
- Clade: Pancrustacea
- Class: Malacostraca
- Order: Decapoda
- Suborder: Pleocyemata
- Infraorder: Brachyura
- Family: Menippidae
- Genus: Menippe
- Species: M. mercenaria

Binomial name
- Menippe mercenaria (Say, 1818)

= Florida stone crab =

Species of crustacean

The Florida stone crab (Menippe mercenaria) is a crab found in the western North Atlantic, from Connecticut to Colombia, including Texas, the Gulf of Mexico, Belize, Mexico, Jamaica, Cuba, the Bahamas, and the East Coast of the United States. The crab can also be found in and around the salt marshes of South Carolina and Georgia. The closely related species Menippe adina, the gulf stone crab, is sometimes considered a subspecies as they can interbreed to form hybrids, and they are treated as one species for commercial fishing, with their ranges partly overlapping. The two species are believed to have diverged approximately 3 million years ago. The species is widely caught for food.

== Description ==
The stone crab's carapace is 5 to 6 1/2 in (125 to 165 mm) wide. They are brownish red with gray spots and a tan underside, and have large and unequally sized chelae (claws) with black tips.

In addition to the usual sexual dimorphism exhibited by crabs, the female Florida stone crabs have a larger carapace than males of a similar age, and males generally have larger chelae than females.

== Habitats ==
Stone crabs can be found in 1/2–3 ft (15–90 cm) deep holes near dock pilings in water 1–5 ft (30–150 cm) deep. Oftentimes the hole will have shells around the opening; the crab uses the shell as a digging tool for the hole construction.

== Life history ==
Florida stone crabs prefer to feed on oysters and other small mollusks, polychaete worms, and other crustaceans. They will also occasionally eat seagrass and carrion. Predators that feed on stone crabs include the horse conch, groupers, sea turtles, cobias, and octopuses.

=== Reproduction ===
Females reach sexual maturity at about two years of age. The male Florida stone crab must wait for the female to molt her exoskeleton before they can mate. After mating, the male will stay to help protect the female for several hours to several days. The female will spawn four to six times each season, which lasts all spring and summer and during which the females produce up to a million eggs each. The larvae go through six stages in about four weeks before emerging as juvenile crabs. Their lifespan is seven to eight years.

=== Molting ===
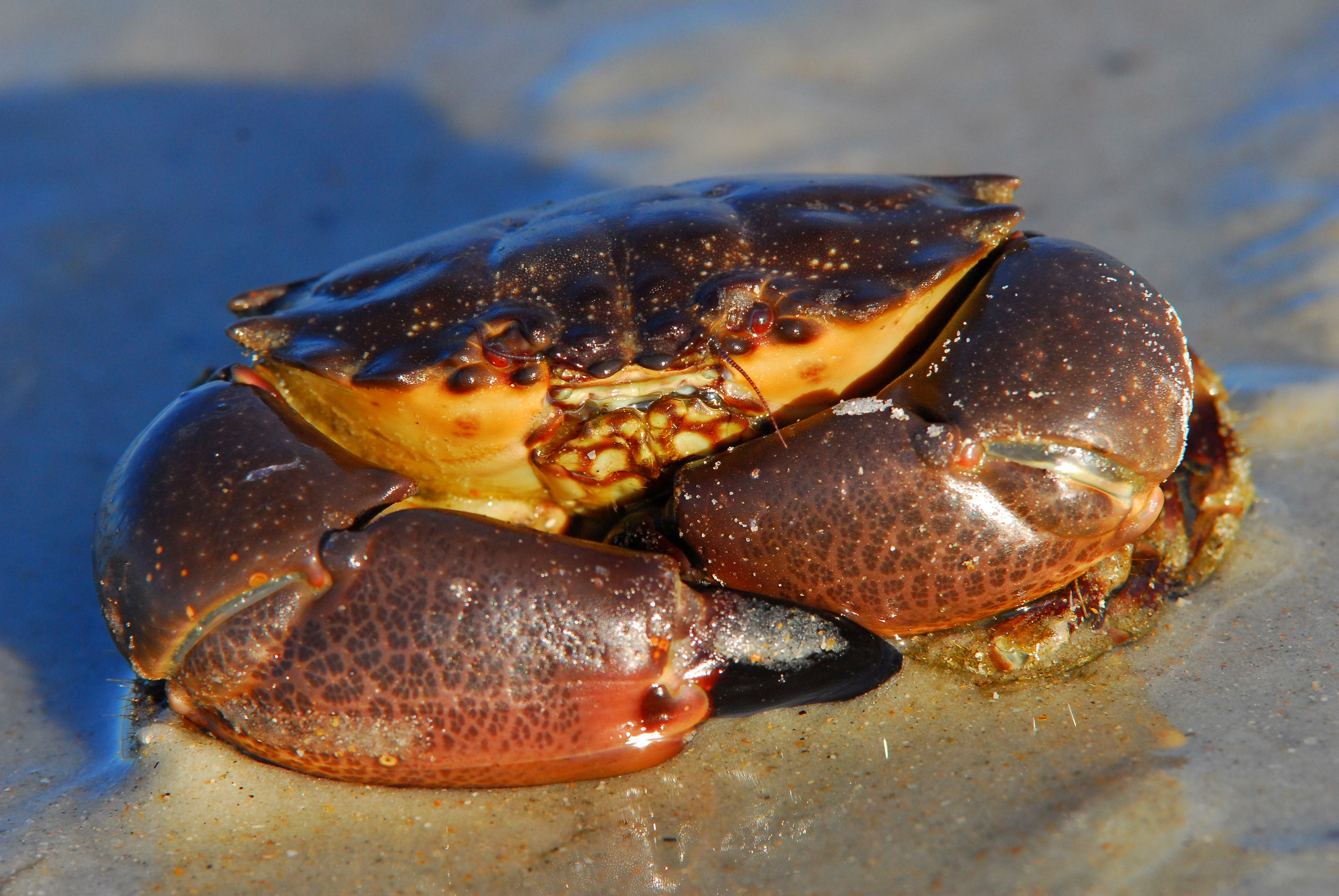
Juvenile Cuban stone crab

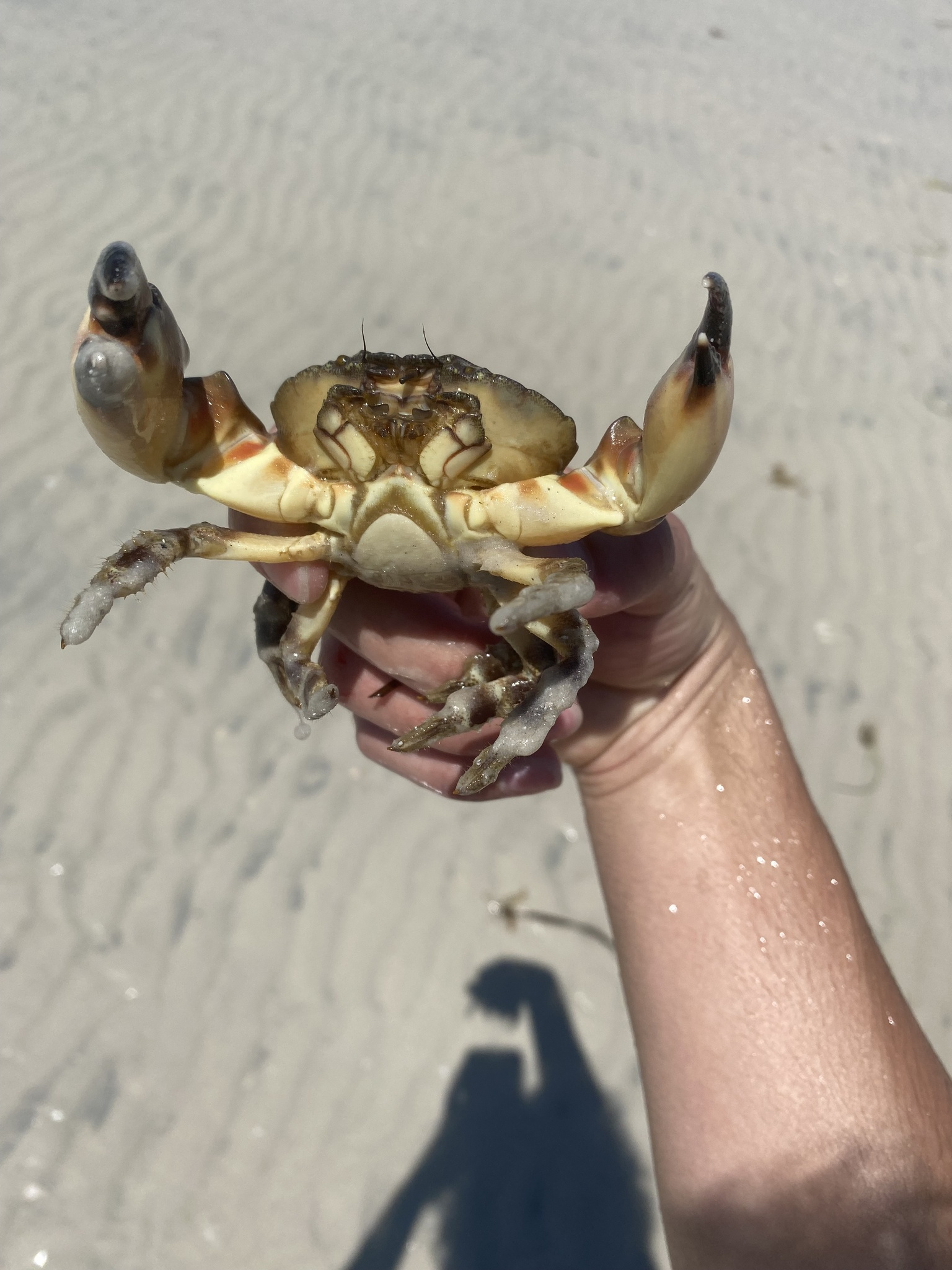
Underside

The Florida stone crab loses its limbs easily to escape from predators or tight spaces, but their limbs will grow back. When a claw is broken such that the diaphragm at the body/claw joint is left intact, the wound will quickly heal itself and very little "blood" (hemolymph) is lost. If, however, the claw is broken in the wrong place, more hemolymph is lost and the crab's chances of survival are much lower. Each time the crab molts, the new claw grows larger.

The crab only molts at night or in night-like conditions due to the crab being extremely vulnerable to predators without the protection of a hard shell. If the crab is becoming too large for its shell and the sun is up, the crab releases a hormone from a gland located on one of its eye stalks called the x-organ. This hormone prevents the crab from molting from its shell until it finds a safe place to molt or it has become dark enough outside to molt in safety.

== Fishery ==
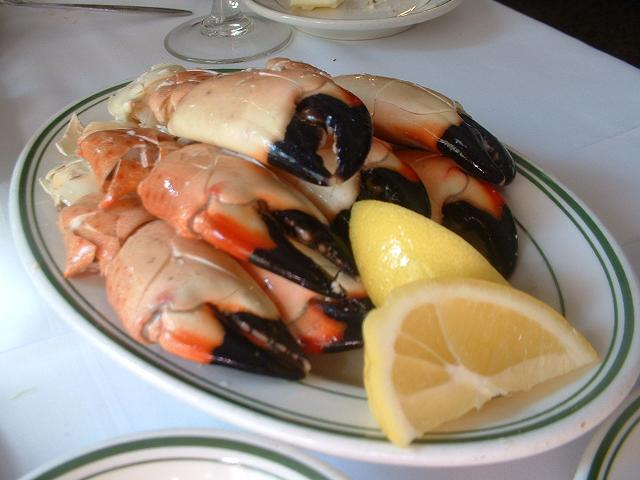
Prepared Florida stone crab claws

The Florida stone crab is usually fished near jetties, oyster reefs or other rocky areas, just as for blue crabs. The bodies of these crabs are relatively small and so are rarely eaten, but the claws (chelae), which are large and strong enough to break an oyster's shell, are considered a delicacy. Harvesting is accomplished by removing one or both claws from the live animal and returning it to the ocean where it can regrow the lost limb(s). To be kept, claws must be 2 7/8 in (75 mm) long, measured from the tips of the immovable finger to the first joint.

The mortality rates of declawed crabs were examined in 1978 by the Everglades National Park Research Center; wild caught crabs were kept in an aquarium and declawed. Mortality rates of 47 percent for doubly declawed and 28 percent for single declawed crabs were subsequently recovered. In the 2011 season the mortality rates was found to be 62.9 percent and 40.8 percent respectively. In retrospect, 20 percent of landed claws are regrown.

In the United States, Florida stone crabs are legal for harvest from October 15 until May 15. The catch varies from year to year, ranging between 2.0 and 3.5 million in the period 1982–2009, overwhelmingly from the Gulf coast (as opposed to Atlantic coast). This is believed to be the maximum amount possible, given current environmental conditions, regulations, and practices. The number of traps tripled between 1989–1990 and 2009–2010 without haul increasing (hence having a very low catch-per-trap level). The Seafood Watch program, managed by the Monterey Bay Aquarium, identifies "high concern" on fishing mortality, "moderate concern" on stock abundance, and the fishery management strategy to be "ineffective."

Claws are sold by size, generally in four sizes: medium, large, jumbo, and colossal.

The top buyer of stone crab claws is Joe's Stone Crab in Miami, and it plays a significant role in the industry, influencing the wholesale price and financing many crabbers.

The Monterey Bay Aquarium's Seafood Watch program, which rates fishery products by sustainability, gives the Florida stone crab its lowest rating of "Avoid" and suggests to "find an alternative" food.

== Harvesting ==
Recreationally, individuals are limited to five traps per person and are required to have a Florida saltwater fishing license. However, regardless of baited traps or hand collecting, the same laws apply, which include not utilizing any gear that harms the physical crabs body, such as spears or hooks. Individuals must use only wood, plastic, or wire traps, and can collect no more than one gallon of claws per day, with no more than two gallons possessed on board a vessel at a given time. Size limit is also 2 7/8inch per claw. And cannot harvest from egg-bearing crabs. For both commercial and recreational use, traps can be no larger than 24x24x24 inches, or a volume of eight cubic feet.
