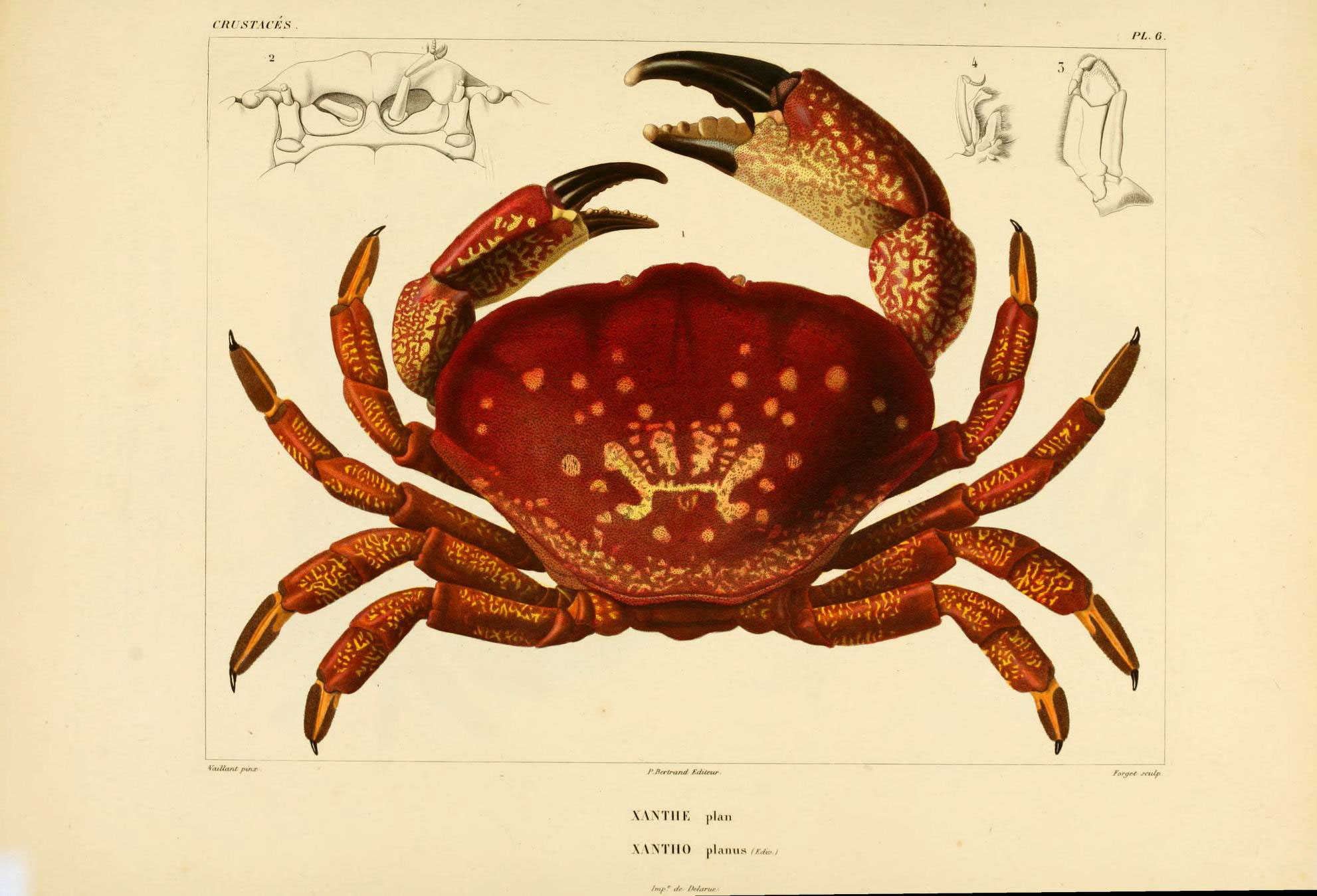

Scientific classification
- Kingdom: Animalia
- Phylum: Arthropoda
- Clade: Pancrustacea
- Class: Malacostraca
- Order: Decapoda
- Suborder: Pleocyemata
- Infraorder: Brachyura
- Family: Platyxanthidae
- Genus: Homalaspis; A. Milne-Edwards, 1863
- Species: H. plana

Binomial name
- Homalaspis plana (H. Milne Edwards, 1834)

Synonyms
- Xantho planus H. Milne Edwards, 1834; Gecarcinus regius Poeppig, 1836

= Homalaspis =

Genus of crabs

Homalaspis is a genus of crabs in the family Platyxanthidae. It is monotypic, the sole species being Homalaspis plana, also known as the purple stone crab or Chilean stone crab.

Homalaspis plana occurs in the East Pacific from the Galápagos Archipelago to southern Patagonia. There is a single record from the west coast of South Africa, likely resulting from shipping or aquaculture imports.

Homalaspis plana lives in the intertidal zone and down to 272 m (892 ft). It is a commercially valuable species.
