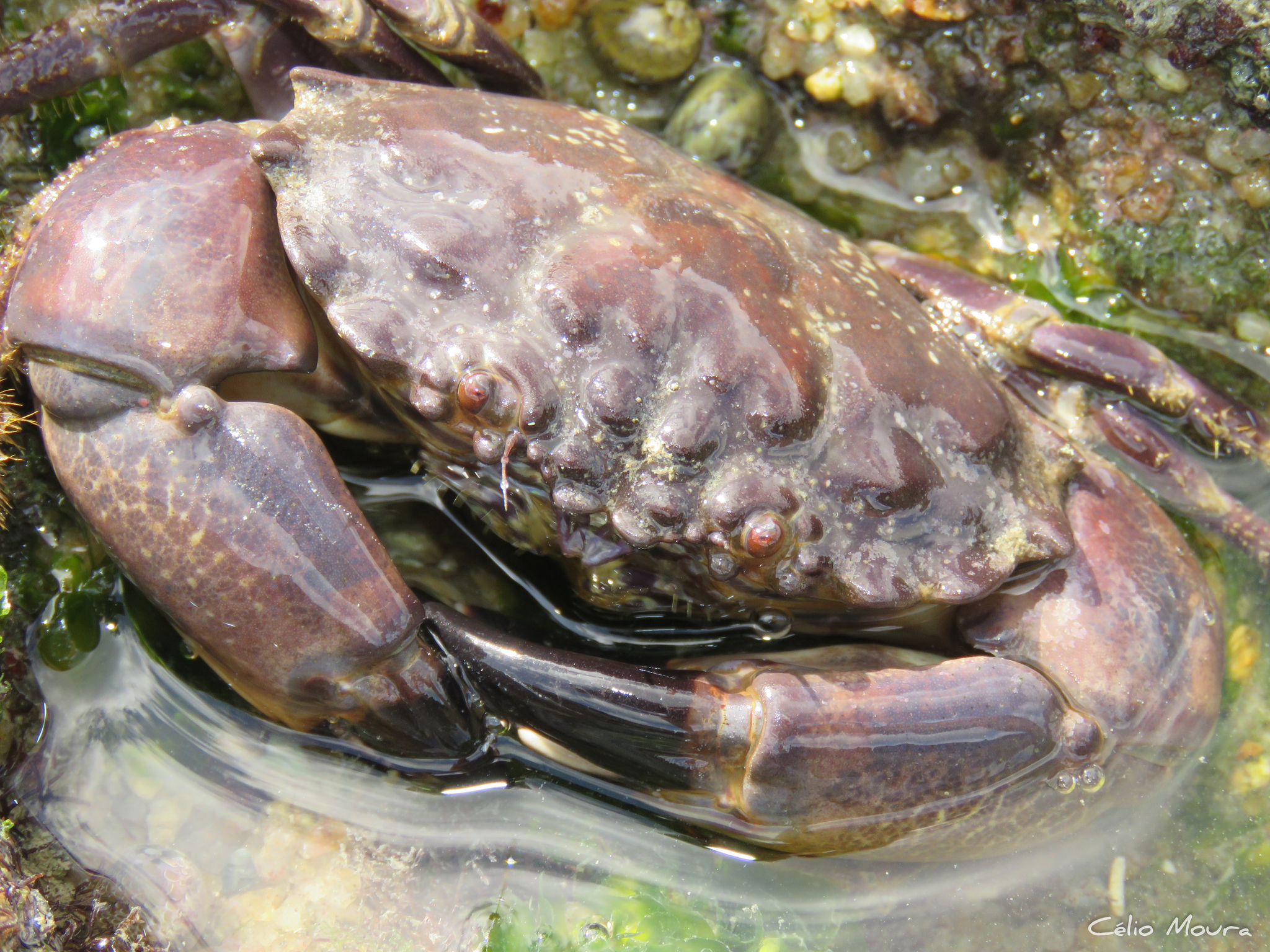

Scientific classification
- Kingdom: Animalia
- Phylum: Arthropoda
- Class: Malacostraca
- Order: Decapoda
- Suborder: Pleocyemata
- Infraorder: Brachyura
- Family: Menippidae
- Genus: Menippe
- Species: M. nodifrons

Binomial name
- Menippe nodifrons Stimpson, 1859

Synonyms
- Menippe nanus A. Milne-Edwards & Bouvier, 1898; Menippe rudis A. Milne-Edwards, 1879

= Menippe nodifrons =

Species of crab

Menippe nodifrons, commonly known as the Cuban stone crab, is a species of crab found in warm tropical waters of the western Atlantic Ocean. It is common in parts of Brazil, and is found in the United States in east-central Florida and off the coast of Louisiana.
