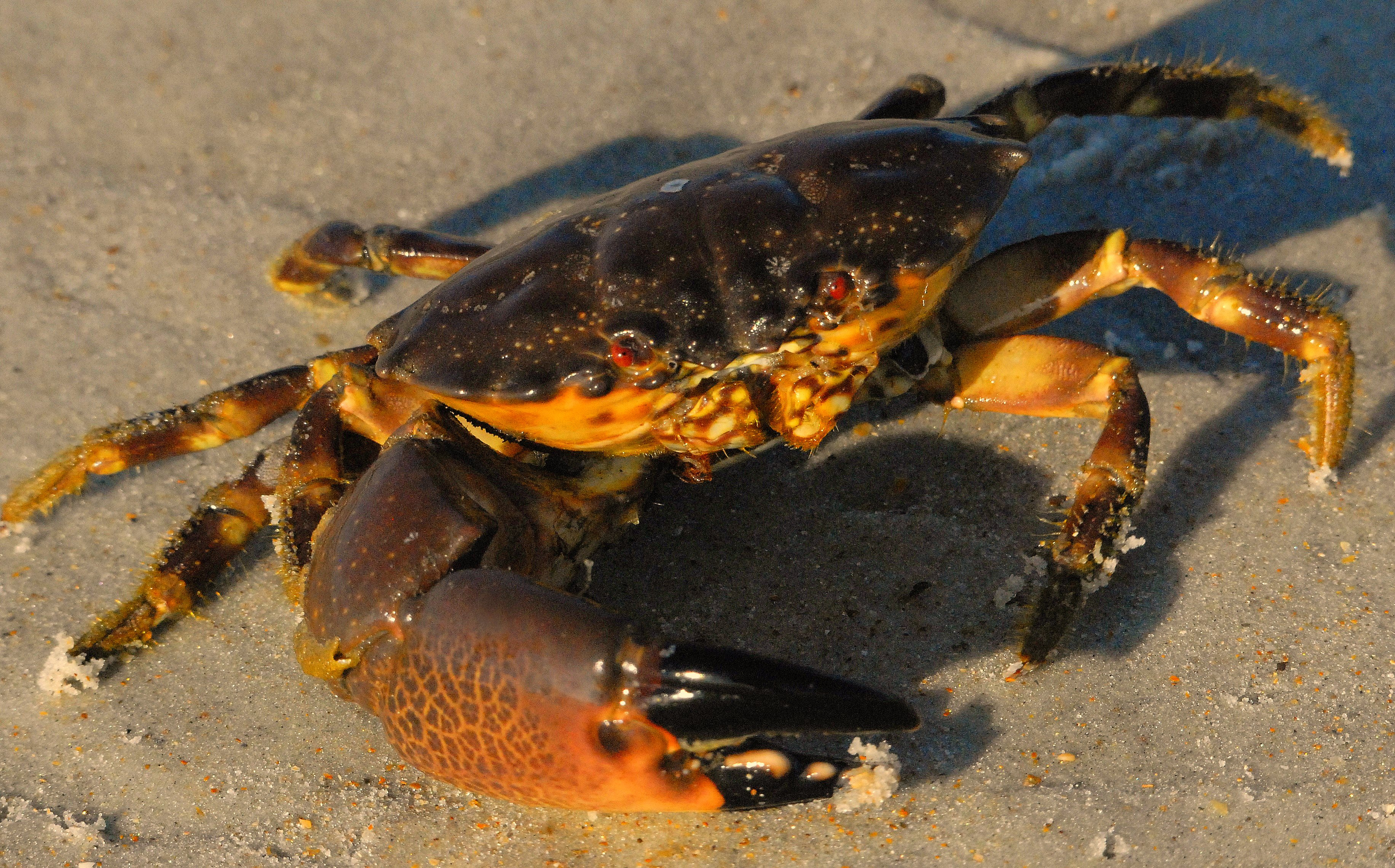
- Menippe mercenaria

Scientific classification
- Kingdom: Animalia
- Phylum: Arthropoda
- Class: Malacostraca
- Order: Decapoda
- Suborder: Pleocyemata
- Infraorder: Brachyura
- Family: Menippidae
- Genus: Menippe; De Haan, 1833

Type species
- Menippe rumphii (Fabricius, 1798)

= Menippe (crab) =

Genus of crabs

Menippe is a genus of true crabs. One of the best known species is the Florida stone crab. Most of the species of this genus are found in the Atlantic Ocean.

== Species ==
Menippe contains the following species:

- Menippe adina Williams & Felder, 1986
- †Menippe brevimanus Rathbun, 1945
- †Menippe burnsi Rathbun, 1935
- †Menippe cretacea Rathbun, 1935
- †Menippe floridana Rathbun, 1935
- †Menippe frescoensis Remy, 1960
- Menippe frontalis A. Milne-Edwards, 1879
- Menippe hirtipes (Lucas in Jacquinot & Lucas, 1853)
- †Menippe jacksonensis Rathbun, 1935
- Menippe mercenaria (Say, 1818)
- Menippe nodifrons Stimpson, 1859
- Menippe obtusa Stimpson, 1859
- †Menippe oceanica Rathbun, 1945
- Menippe rumphii (Fabricius, 1798)
- †Menippe zoque (Vega, Feldmann, García-Barrera, Filkorn, Pimentel & Avendano, 2001)
