= Joe's Stone Crab =

Restaurant in Miami Beach, Florida, U.S.

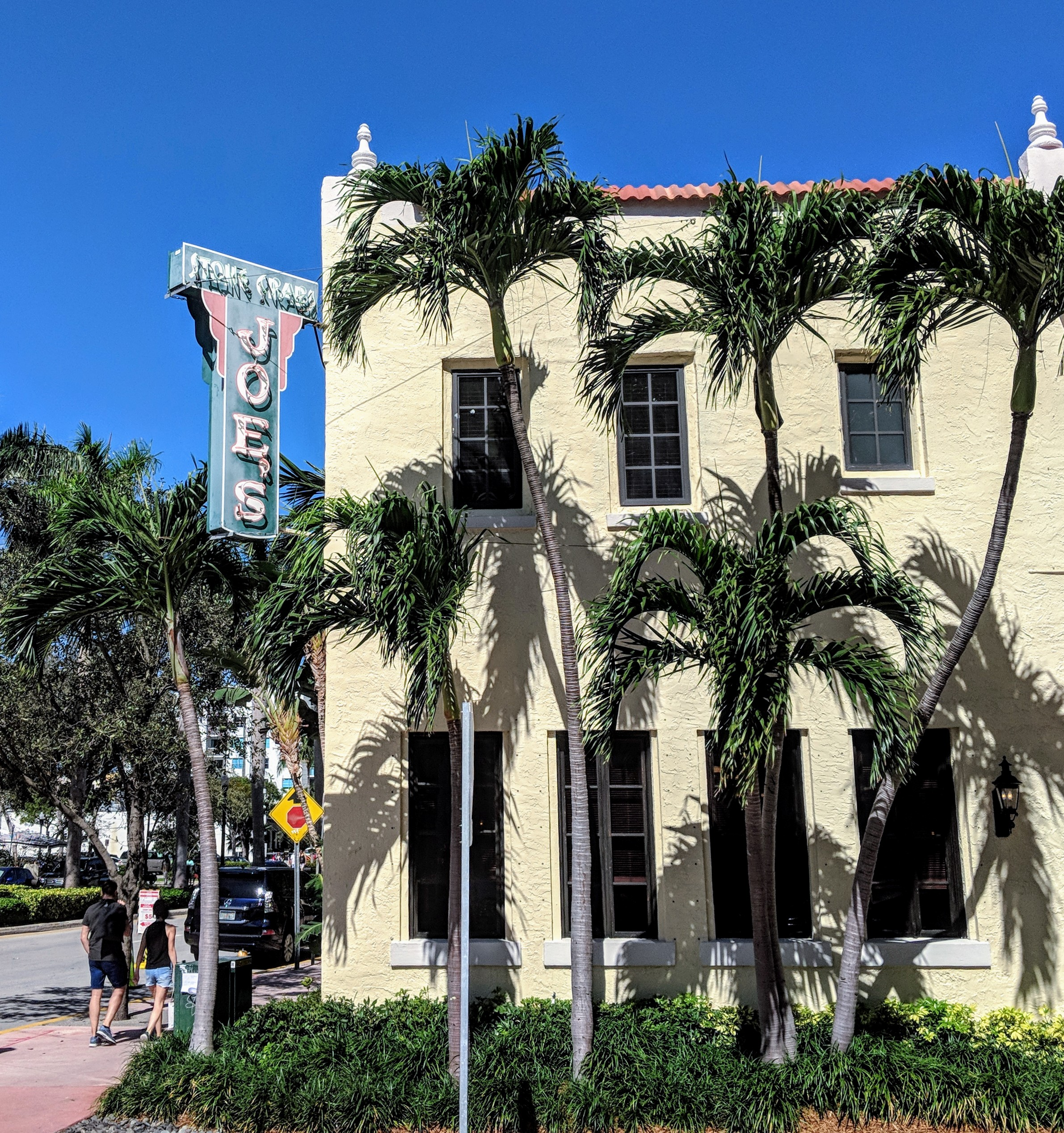
- Joe's Stone Crab in 2019
- Interactive map of Joe's Stone Crab

Restaurant information
- Established: 1913; 113 years ago
- Owners: Jo Ann Bass and Stephen Sawitz
- Previous owners: Founded by Joe and Jenny Weiss
- Food type: Seafood and steaks
- Dress code: business or smart casual attire
- Location: 11 Washington Ave, Miami Beach, Florida, 33139, United States
- Coordinates: 25°46′09″N 80°08′06″W
- Website: www.joesstonecrab.com

Joe's Stone Crab is an American seafood restaurant in Miami Beach, Florida. In 1998 the restaurant won an America's Classic Award from the James Beard Foundation It is consistently among the highest grossing individual restaurants in the United States, with 2024 sales approaching $50 million.

Joe's Stone Crab is the biggest buyer of Florida stone crab claws, and it plays a significant role in the industry, while financing many crabbers.

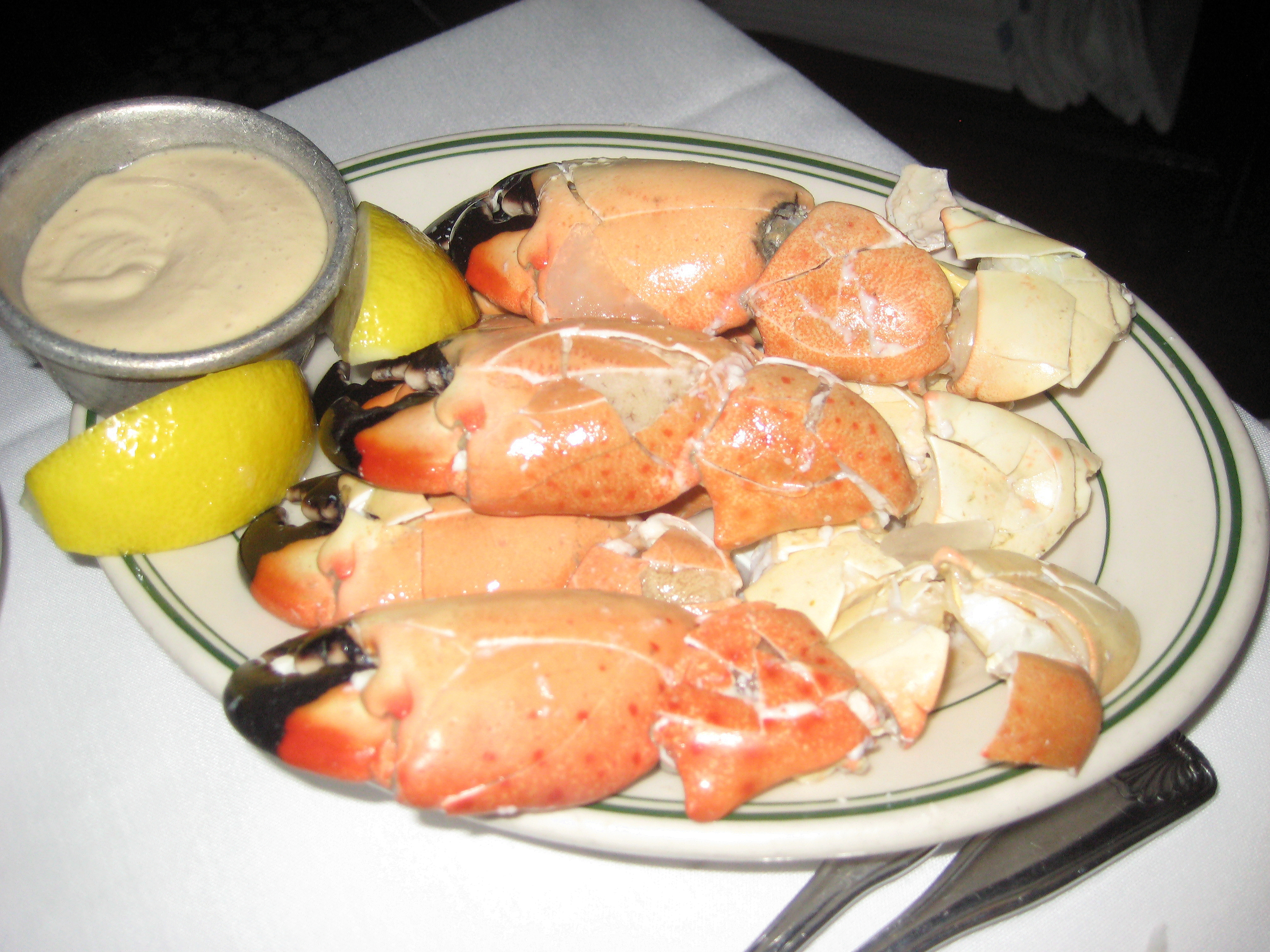
A plate of stone crab claws with lemon wedges and mustard sauce at Joe's.

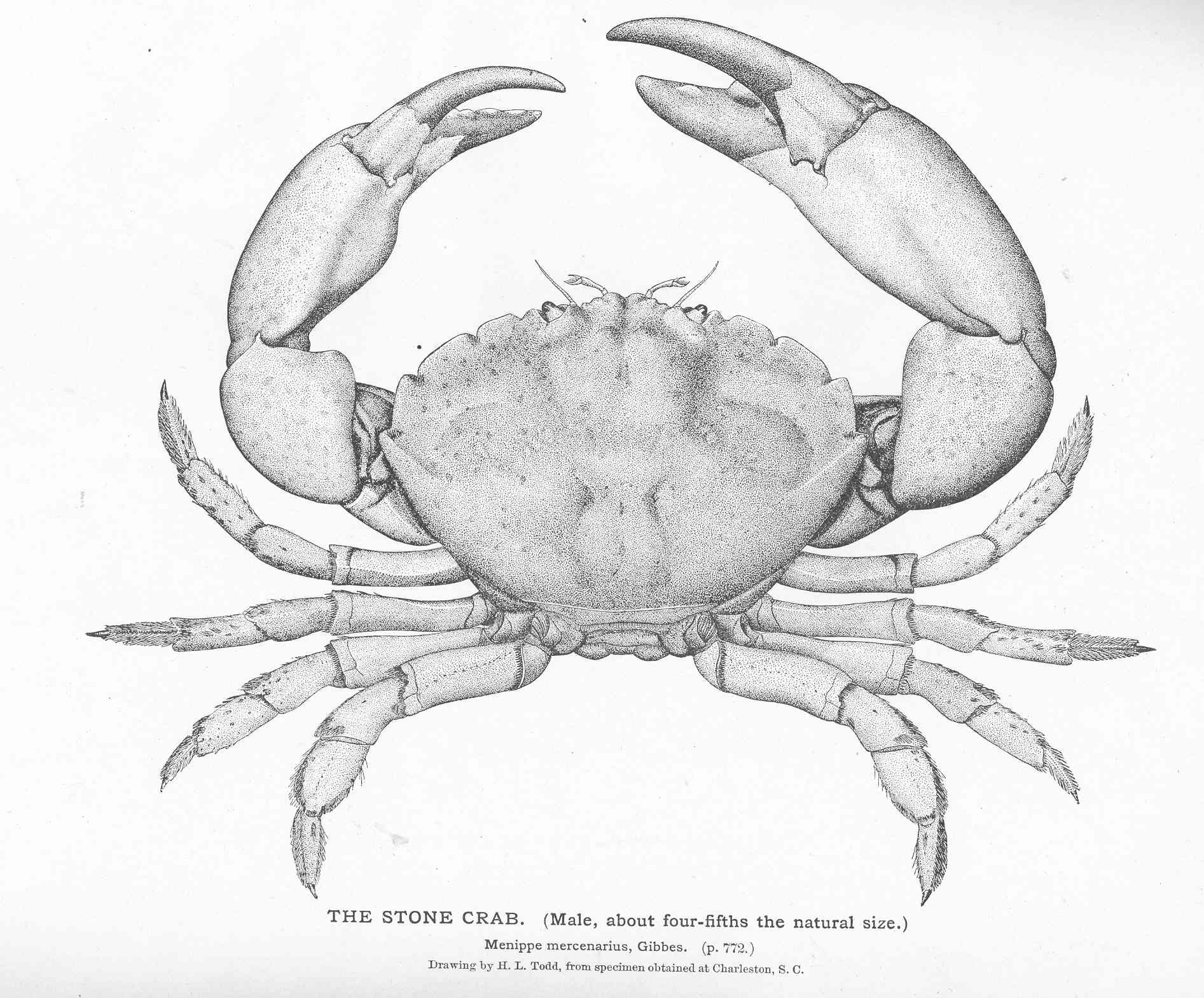
1886 illustration of a male stone crab

Even though stone crabs are their most famous dish now, fish was served, rather than crabs, in the early years after the restaurant's opening. According to lore, when an ichthyologist asked founder Joe Weiss why he didn't serve stone crabs, he answered that no one would want to eat them. He was wrong, as they found out soon after first cooking them.

== Menu ==
Fresh stone crab claws are available from October 15 until May 1, the period when the regulated catch is legal. At other times of the year, the restaurant operates on a reduced schedule and serves frozen stone crab claws. In addition to stone crab, the restaurant is known for reasonably priced fried chicken and fried oysters. Lamb chops, a variety of steaks, and baby back ribs are on the menu. Vegetables include creamed spinach, chopped salad, grilled tomatoes, onion rings, baked potatoes, Lyonnaise potatoes, and fried asparagus. Other seafood items include King crab legs, shrimp cocktail, crab cakes, and crab niçoise salad. Key lime pie and brownie sundaes are among the dessert options.

== History ==
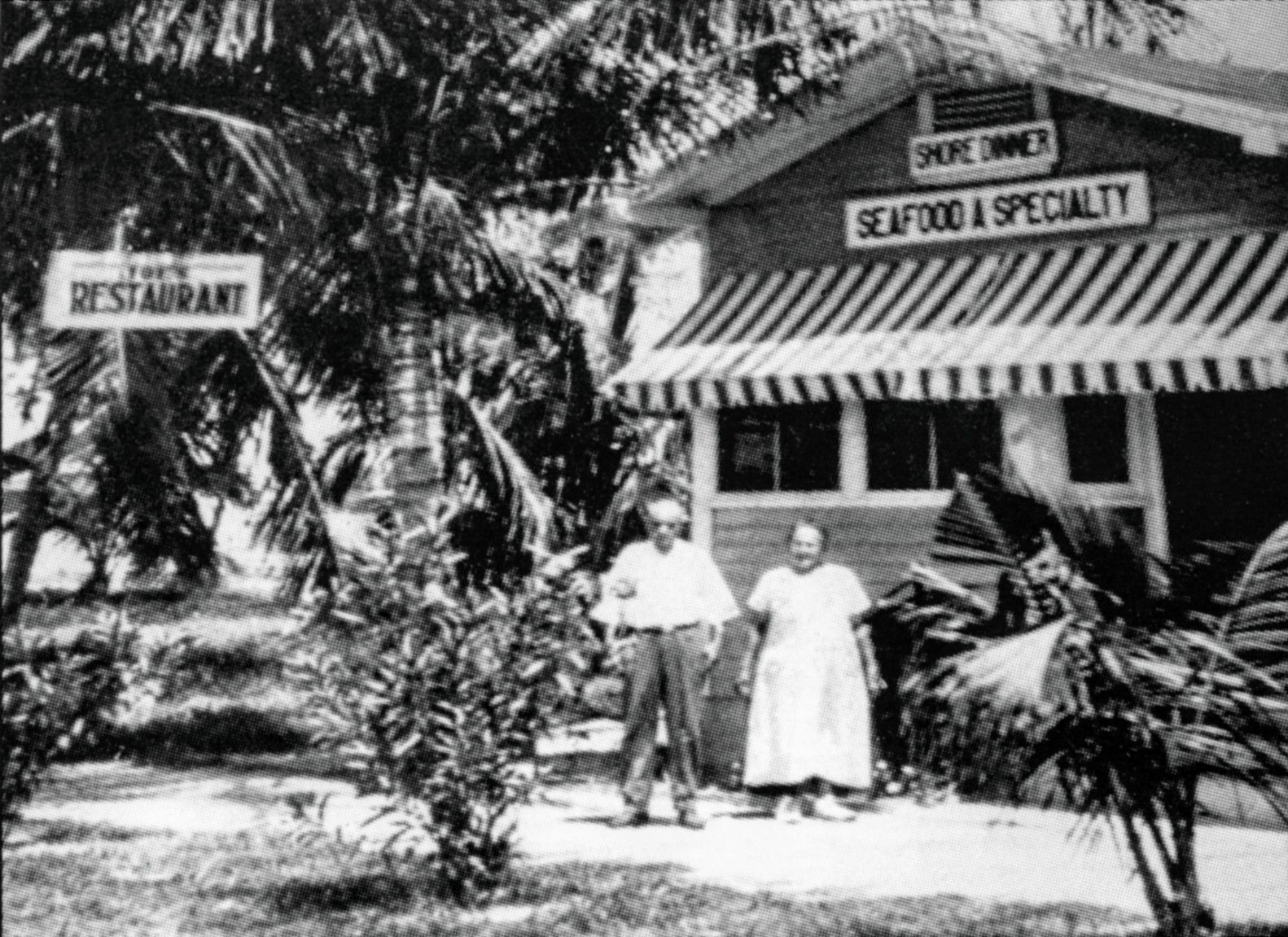
Joe and Jennie Weiss in front of their first restaurant

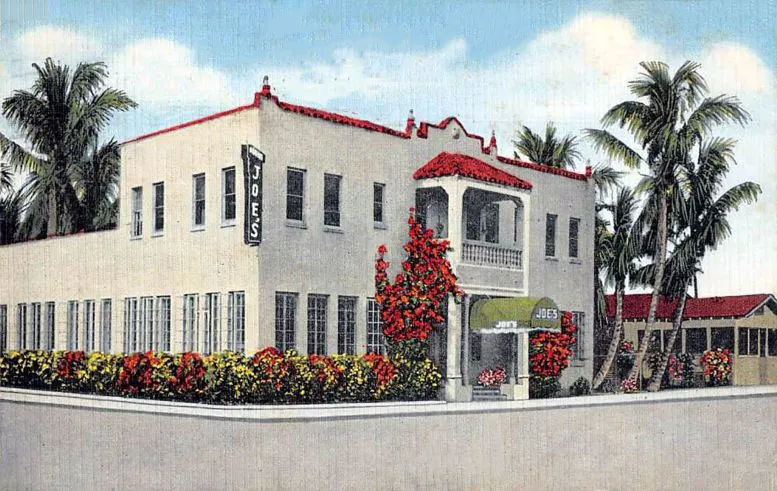
Joe's Stone Crab in 1929, then located at 237 Biscayne Street, Miami Beach

Joe and Jenny Weiss were Jewish immigrants from Hungary who initially settled in New York, where their son Jesse was born in 1907. Joe worked in a restaurant in the Bronx, where he learned the recipes for several dishes that he later offered in Miami Beach. Joe had asthma and borrowed against a life insurance policy to travel to Miami Beach in 1913, where he found relief from his symptoms. His wife and son soon followed to Miami Beach. That year, the couple opened a seafood service concession at Smith's Bathing Casino, and in 1918, they purchased a small house across the street and established Joe's Diner in 1920. This was the beginning of the restaurant business in Miami Beach, which was not yet a city.

Many accounts describe a visit to the Weiss's restaurant in the early 1920s by an ichthyologist from Harvard University, who suggested that they consider serving stone crabs as a dish. One source mentions George Howard Parker as that scientist. He was a zoologist who studied crustaceans extensively, especially their perception. When they added that dish to the menu, business grew, along with the influx of more tourists.

In 1975, Joe's Stone Crab was designated a Miami Beach historic landmark.

In 1999, Lettuce Entertain You Enterprises became involved and opened a branch in Chicago, followed by the 2005 opening in Las Vegas, Nevada, and in 2014 Washington, D.C. These branches are known as Joe's Seafood, Prime Steak & Stone Crab to set them apart from the fourth-generation owned Miami original.

In 1998, they won an America's Classic Award by the James Beard Foundation

== In the media ==
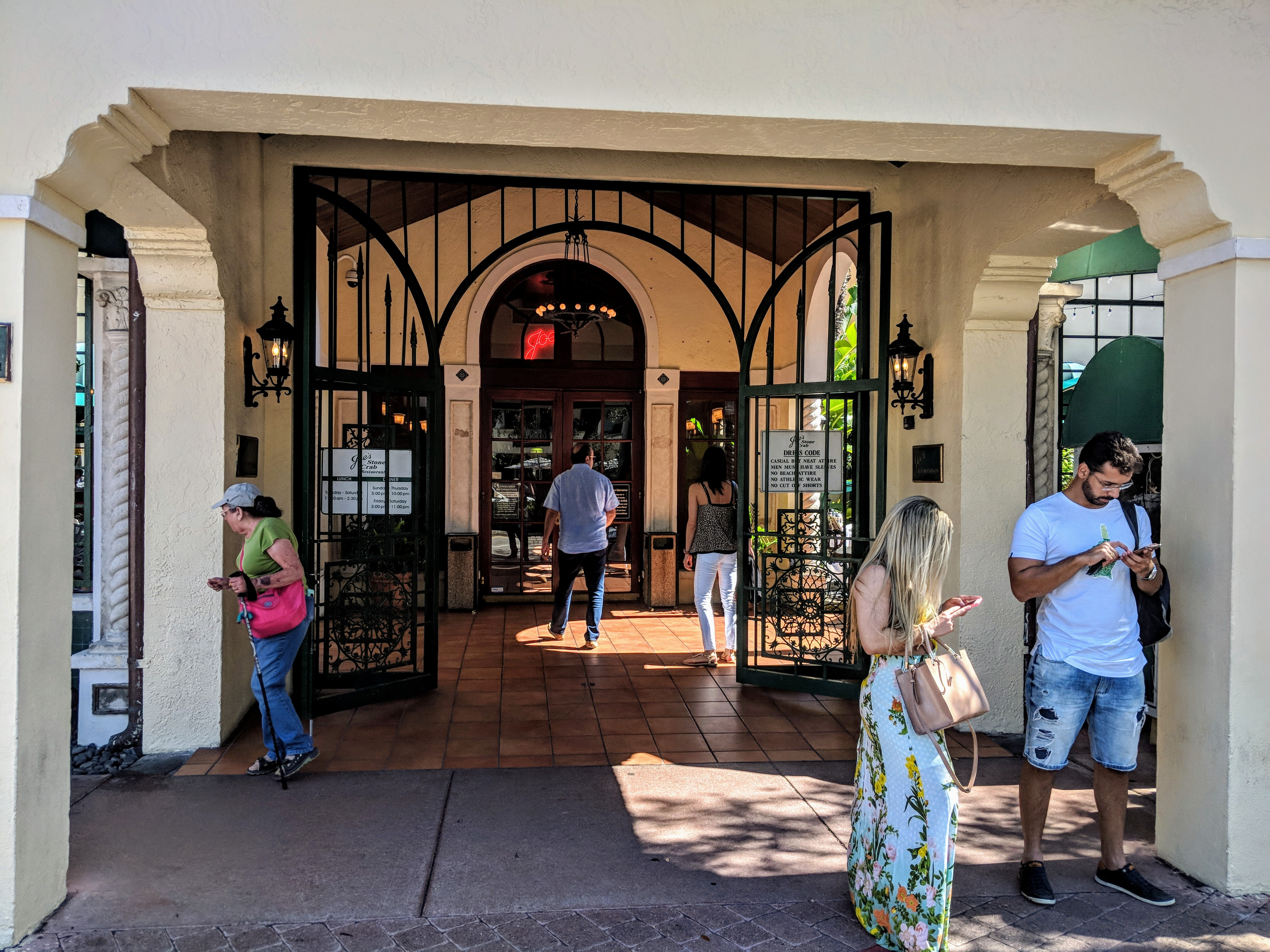
Joe's Stone Crab entrance area

Restaurant Business Magazine, the industry publication of record, reported in October 2014 that Joe's Stone Crab ranked second in the United States with $35.3 million in revenue in 2013.

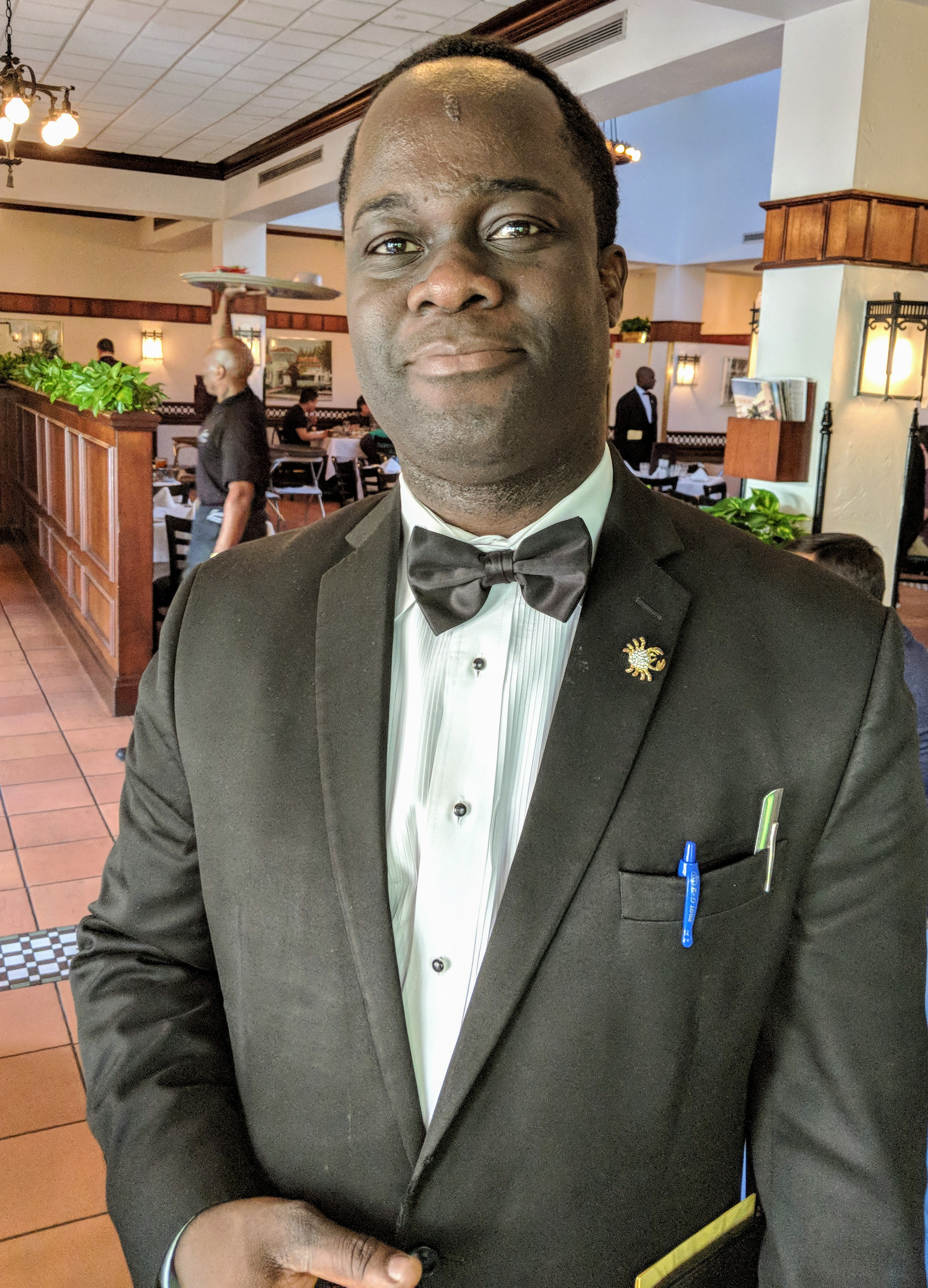
A waiter at Joe's Stone Crab wearing a crab lapel pin

According to USA Today, in 2017, Joe's Stone Crab in Miami Beach was the second highest grossing restaurant in the United States and second only to Tao Las Vegas, with sales of $37,243,159. They served 316,000 meals that year. By 2019, Joe's Stone Crab was the highest-grossing independent restaurant in the US, grossing $38.4 million in 2019. In 2024, the restaurant had $49,413,190 in annual sales, highest in the United States.

Politicians, actors, and athletes often visit Joe's Stone Crab.

== See also ==
- List of seafood restaurants
- South Beach, Florida
