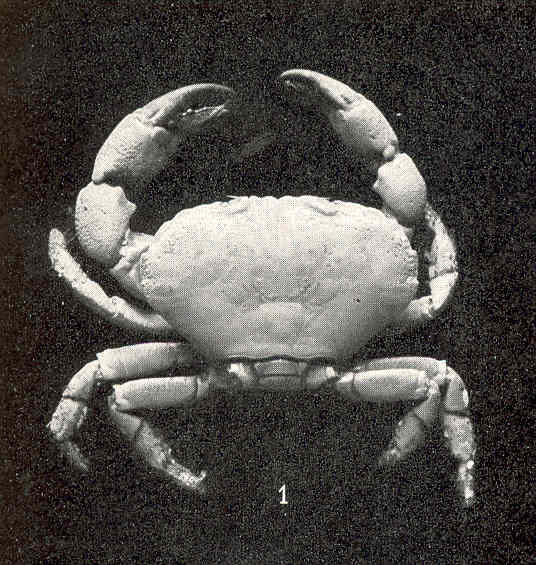

Scientific classification
- Kingdom: Animalia
- Phylum: Arthropoda
- Class: Malacostraca
- Order: Decapoda
- Suborder: Pleocyemata
- Infraorder: Brachyura
- Superfamily: Pseudozioidea
- Family: Pseudoziidae

= Pseudoziidae =

Family of crabs

Pseudoziidae is a family of crustaceans belonging to superfamily Pseudozioidea in the order Decapoda.

== Genera ==
The genus contains two extant and three extinct genera:

- †Archaeozius Schweitzer, 2003
- Euryozius Miers, 1886
- Pseudozius Dana, 1851
- †Santeexanthus Blow & Manning, 1996
- †Tongapapaka Feldmann, Schweitzer & McLaughlin, 2006
