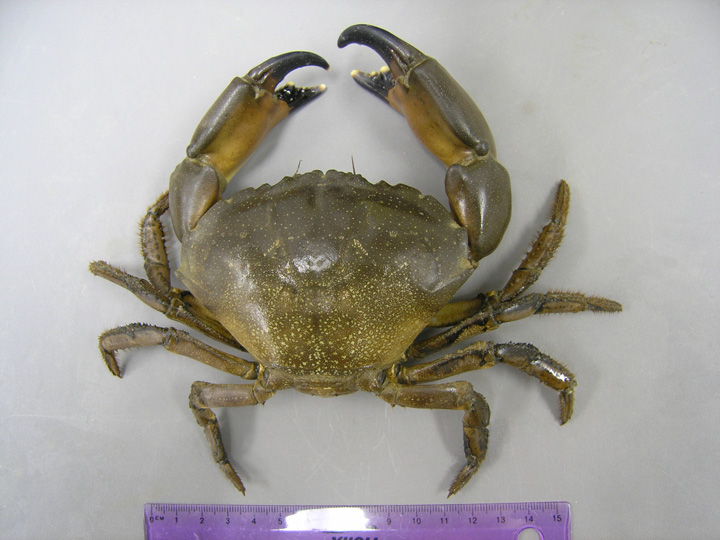

Scientific classification
- Domain: Eukaryota
- Kingdom: Animalia
- Phylum: Arthropoda
- Class: Malacostraca
- Order: Decapoda
- Suborder: Pleocyemata
- Infraorder: Brachyura
- Family: Menippidae
- Genus: Menippe
- Species: M. adina

Binomial name
- Menippe adina Williams & Felder, 1986

= Menippe adina =

Species of crustacean (crab)

Menippe adina is a species of crab, sometimes called the Gulf stone crab or Western Gulf stone crab. It is very closely related to the Florida stone crab, Menippe mercenaria, of which it is sometimes considered to be a subspecies.

== Description ==
Stone crabs have a hard exoskeleton shell which is brownish red with gray spots on top but a tan underside. They have two large and unequally-sized chelae (claws), which have black tips. The stone crab's carapace, or main shell, is 3-to-3.5 in long (76.2-to-88.9 mm) and nearly 4 inches (102 mm) wide. The males have a smaller carapace than females of a similar age, but males generally have larger chelae than females.

== Range ==
The geographic range of M. adina overlaps with that of M. mercenaria, extending from Wakulla County, Florida around the Gulf of Mexico to Tamaulipas state, Mexico.

== Fishery ==
Stone crabs are typically found feeding near jetties, oyster reefs, or other rocky areas, as well as in marshes, such as where blue crabs are, and can be caught with line or in traps. The Florida Fish and Wildlife Conservation Commission recommends that crabs be permitted to retain a claw, as crabs with both claws removed are more likely to die after release, and the crab should be returned live to the spot from which it was harvested. The claws must be at least 2.875 inches (7.3 cm), as measured from the tip of the lower, immovable finger to the first joint beyond it, and harvest from egg-bearing crabs is prohibited. Post-release mortality in Florida stone crabs (M. mercenaria) with one claw removed is reduced if the claw is broken with an intact diaphragm (basi-ischium), when compared to cases where the fracture plane occurs at the distal merus (in the claw) or proximal coxa (in the body cavity). Fishing for Florida stone crabs in warm water temperatures also increases post-release mortality. The authors of a declawing study conducted in M. mercenaria concluded that there was "a very high mortality rate associated with declawing" especially in water temperatures exceeding 20 °C (68 °F).
