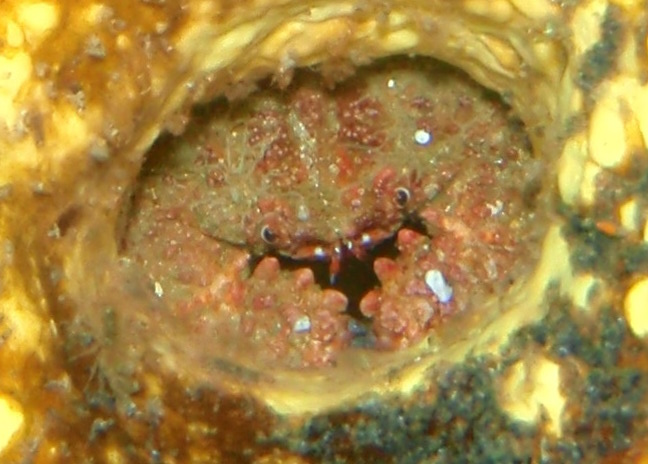
- Pilumnoides rubus

Scientific classification
- Kingdom: Animalia
- Phylum: Arthropoda
- Class: Malacostraca
- Order: Decapoda
- Suborder: Pleocyemata
- Infraorder: Brachyura
- Family: Pilumnoididae
- Genus: Pilumnoides; H. Lucas in H. Milne-Edwards & H. Lucas, 1844

Type species
- Pilumnoides perlatus (Poeppig, 1836)

= Pilumnoides =

Genus of crabs

Pilumnoides is a genus of crabs in the family Pilumnoididae. The genus was erected by Hippolyte Lucas in 1844. It contains the following species:

- Pilumnoides coelhoi Guinot & Macpherson, 1987 – Abrolhos Archipelago
- Pilumnoides hassleri A. Milne-Edwards, 1880 – Atlantic coast of South America
- Pilumnoides inglei Guinot & Macpherson, 1987 – south coast of England
- Pilumnoides monodi Guinot & Macpherson, 1987 – Gabon
- Pilumnoides nudifrons (Stimpson, 1871) – Caribbean Sea
- Pilumnoides perlatus (Poeppig, 1836) – Pacific coast of South America
- Pilumnoides rotundus Garth, 1940 – Pacific coast of the Neotropics
- Pilumnoides rubus Guinot & Macpherson, 1987 – south-western Africa
