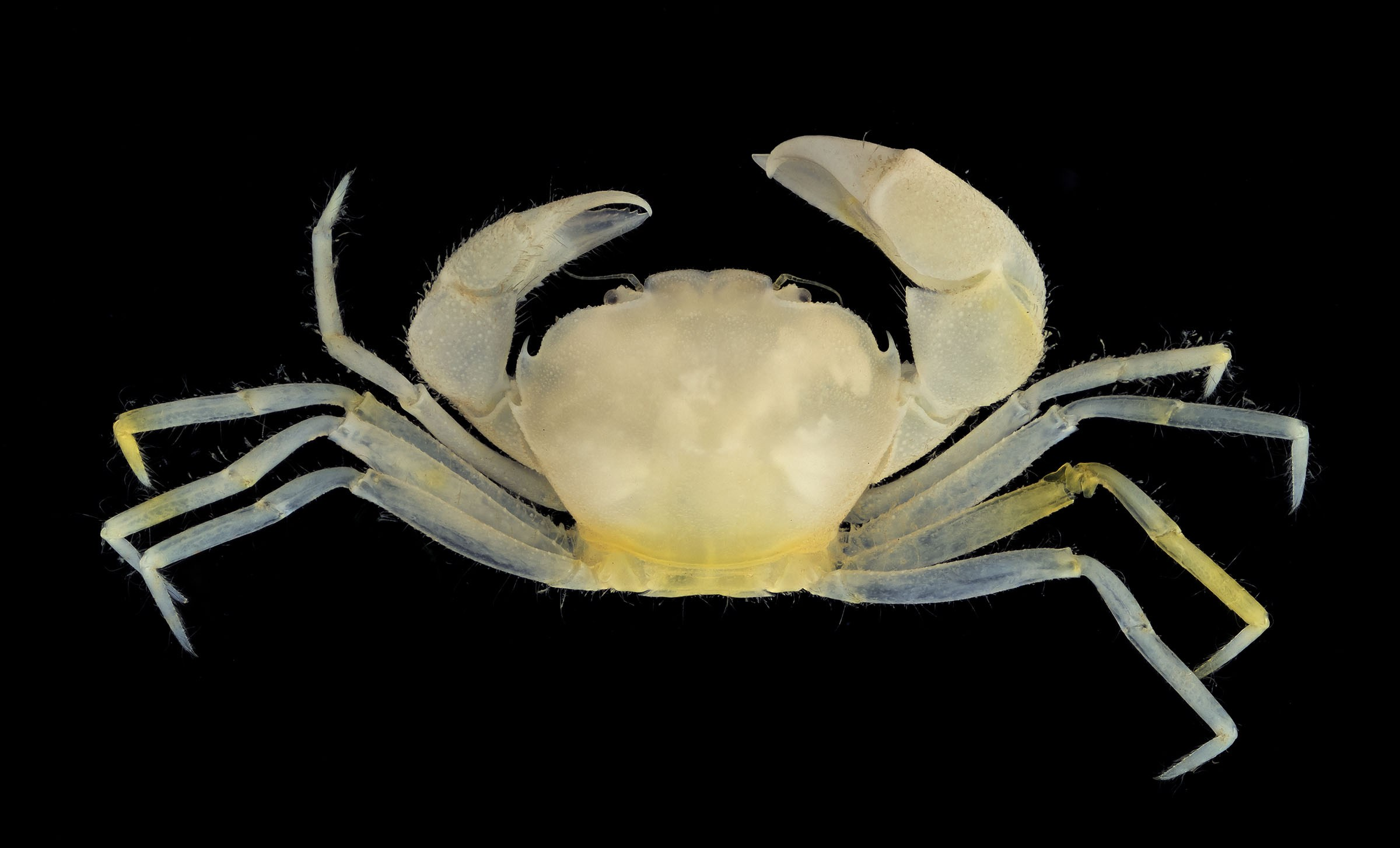

Scientific classification
- Kingdom: Animalia
- Phylum: Arthropoda
- Class: Malacostraca
- Order: Decapoda
- Suborder: Pleocyemata
- Infraorder: Brachyura
- Family: Christmaplacidae
- Genus: Harryplax; Mendoza & Ng, 2017
- Species: H. severus

Binomial name
- Harryplax severus Mendoza & Ng, 2017

= Harryplax =

Genus of crabs

Harryplax is a genus of crab containing the sole species Harryplax severus, native to Guam, where it is found in offshore coral rubble. Measuring 7.9 by 5.6 mm (0.31 by 0.22 in), H. severus occurs at depths of 1 to 7.6 m (3.3 to 24.9 ft). First collected in 1998 and described in 2017, the genus name honors collector Harry T. Conley, as well as the literary character Harry Potter, an allusion to Conley's "uncanny ability to collect rare and interesting creatures as if by magic." The species name alludes to Severus Snape, also from the Harry Potter series.
