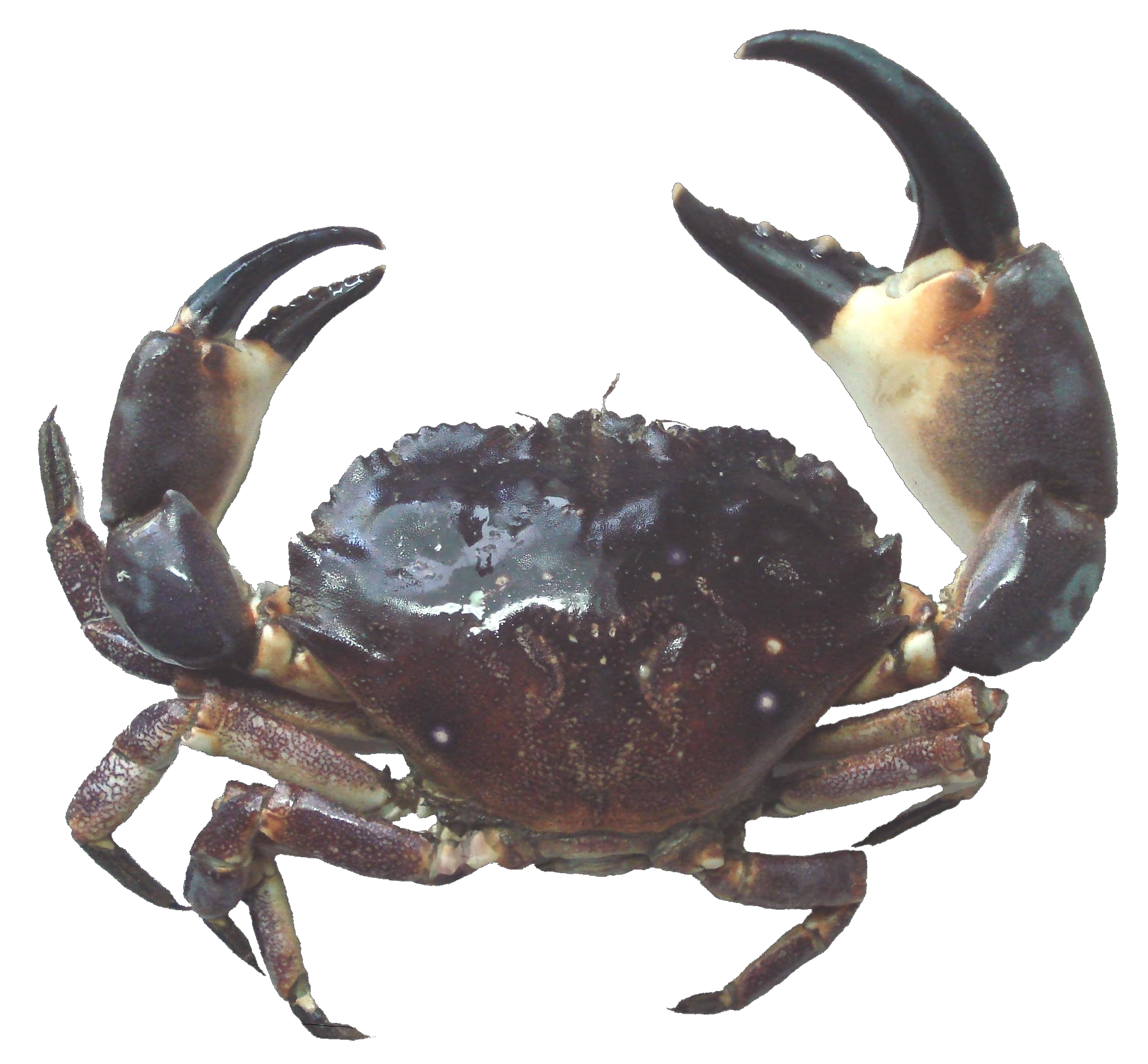
- Danielethus crenulatus (formerly Platyxanthus crenulatus)

Scientific classification
- Kingdom: Animalia
- Phylum: Arthropoda
- Clade: Pancrustacea
- Class: Malacostraca
- Order: Decapoda
- Suborder: Pleocyemata
- Infraorder: Brachyura
- Section: Eubrachyura
- Subsection: Heterotremata
- Superfamily: Eriphioidea
- Family: Platyxanthidae; Guinot, 1977

Genera
- 5 genera (see text)

= Platyxanthidae =

Family of crabs

Platyxanthidae is a family of marine crabs in the superfamily Eriphioidea.

== Genera ==
There are five recognized genera:

- Danielethus Thoma, Ng & Felder, 2012
- Homalaspis A. Milne-Edwards, 1863
- Otmaroxanthus Števčić, 2011
- Peloeus Eydoux & Souleyet, 1842
- Platyxanthus A. Milne-Edwards, 1863
