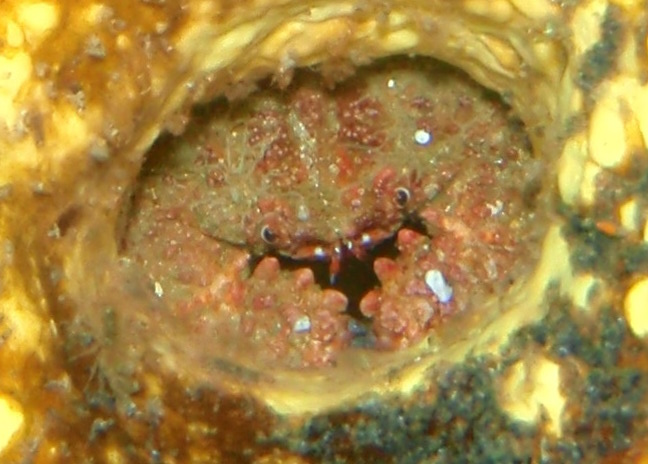

Scientific classification
- Kingdom: Animalia
- Phylum: Arthropoda
- Class: Malacostraca
- Order: Decapoda
- Suborder: Pleocyemata
- Infraorder: Brachyura
- Section: Eubrachyura
- Subsection: Heterotremata
- Superfamily: Pseudozioidea
- Family: Pilumnoididae; Guinot & Macpherson, 1987

Genera
- Pilumnoides; Setozius

= Pilumnoididae =

Family of crabs

Pilumnoididae is a family of crabs containing the genera Pilumnoides, with several species, and the monotypic Setozius.
