= Christmaplax =

Scientific classification
- Kingdom: Animalia
- Phylum: Arthropoda
- Class: Malacostraca
- Order: Decapoda
- Suborder: Pleocyemata
- Infraorder: Brachyura
- Family: Christmaplacidae
- Genus: Christmaplax; Naruse & Ng, 2014
- Species: C. mirabilis

Binomial name
- Christmaplax mirabilis Naruse & Ng, 2014

Genus of crabs

Christmaplax mirabilis is a species of crab native to Christmas Island, Australia. It is the only known species in the genus Christmaplax.
