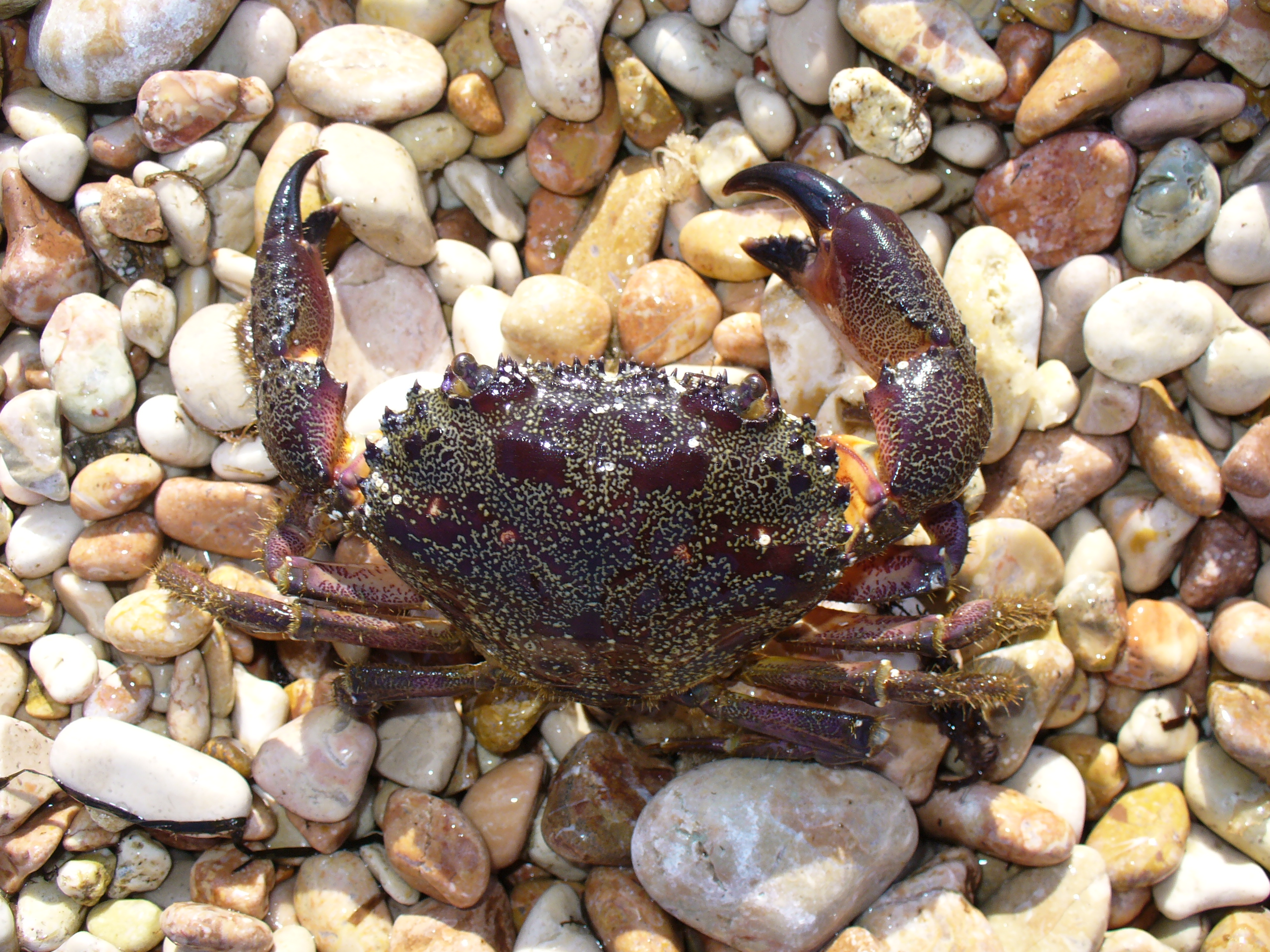
- Eriphia verrucosa (Eriphiidae)

Scientific classification
- Kingdom: Animalia
- Phylum: Arthropoda
- Class: Malacostraca
- Order: Decapoda
- Suborder: Pleocyemata
- Infraorder: Brachyura
- Subsection: Heterotremata
- Superfamily: Eriphioidea; Macleay, 1838

Families
- 6 families

= Eriphioidea =

Superfamily of crabs

Eriphioidea is a superfamily of crabs. It contains six families:

- Dairoididae Števčić, 2005
- Eriphiidae MacLeay, 1838
- Hypothalassiidae Karasawa & Schweitzer, 2006
- Menippidae Ortmann, 1893
- Oziidae Dana, 1851
- Platyxanthidae Guinot, 1977

The families are united by a number of characters, including a marked difference in size between the left and right claws, where the larger one has a crushing tooth, and the smaller one does not, and the relative breadth of the male abdomen.
