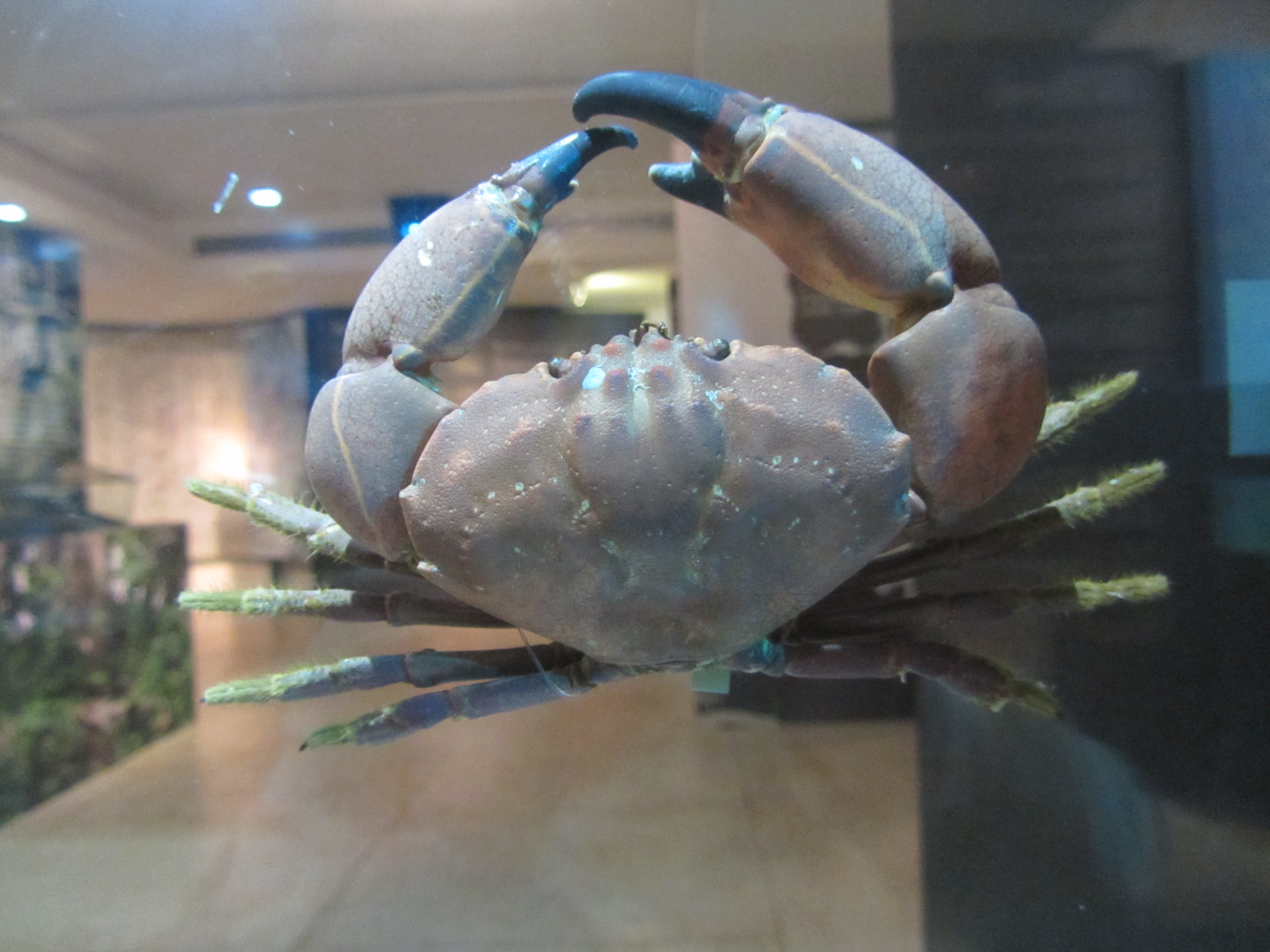
- Menippe rumphii

Scientific classification
- Kingdom: Animalia
- Phylum: Arthropoda
- Clade: Pancrustacea
- Class: Malacostraca
- Order: Decapoda
- Suborder: Pleocyemata
- Infraorder: Brachyura
- Superfamily: Eriphioidea
- Family: Menippidae; Ortmann, 1893

Genera
- See text

= Menippidae =

Family of crabs

Menippidae is a family of crabs of the order Decapoda.

== Genera ==
- Menippe De Haan, 1833
- Myomenippe Hilgendorf, 1879
- Sphaerozius Stimpson, 1858
