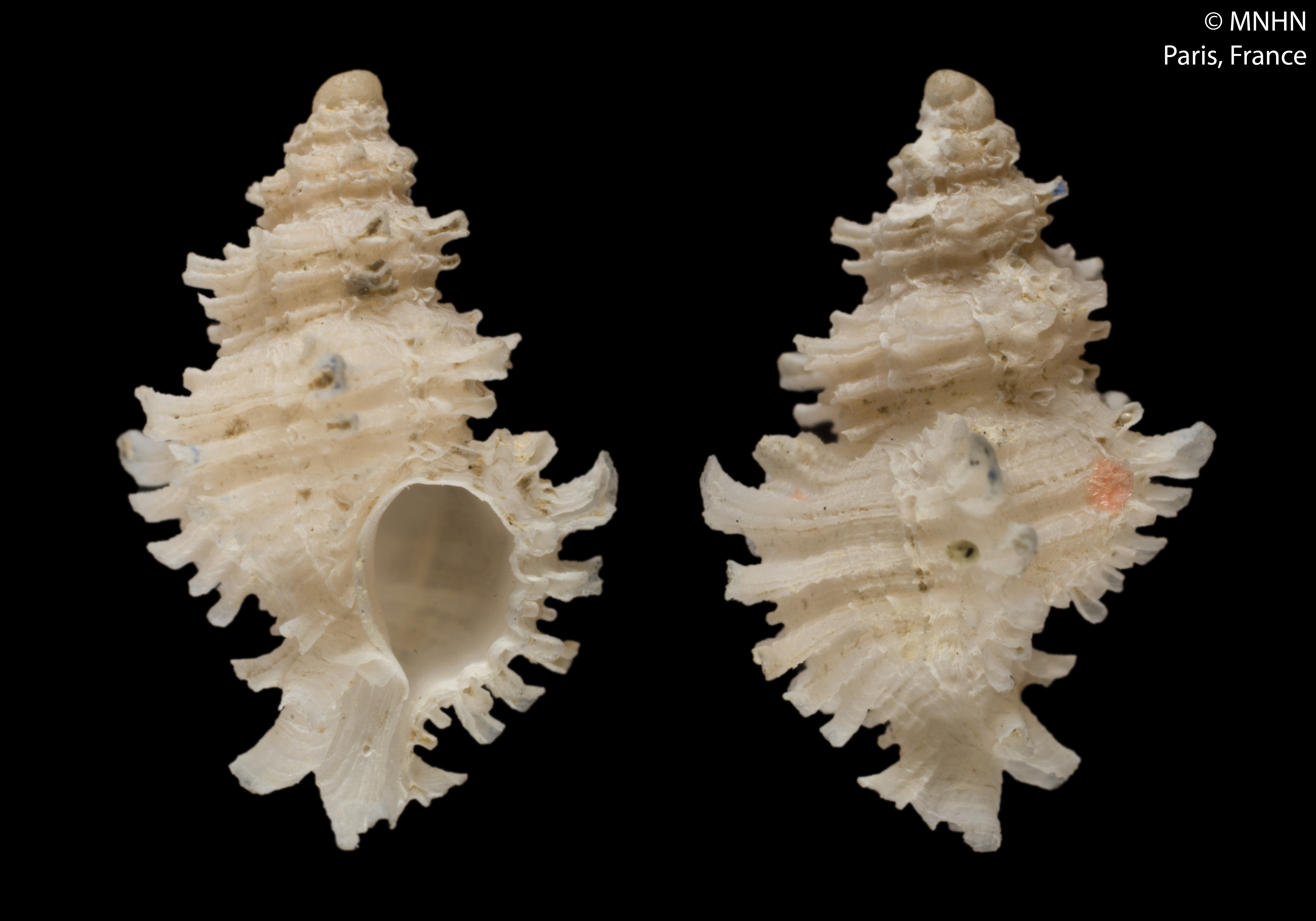
- Holotype of Favartia paulmieri (specimen at MNHN, Paris)
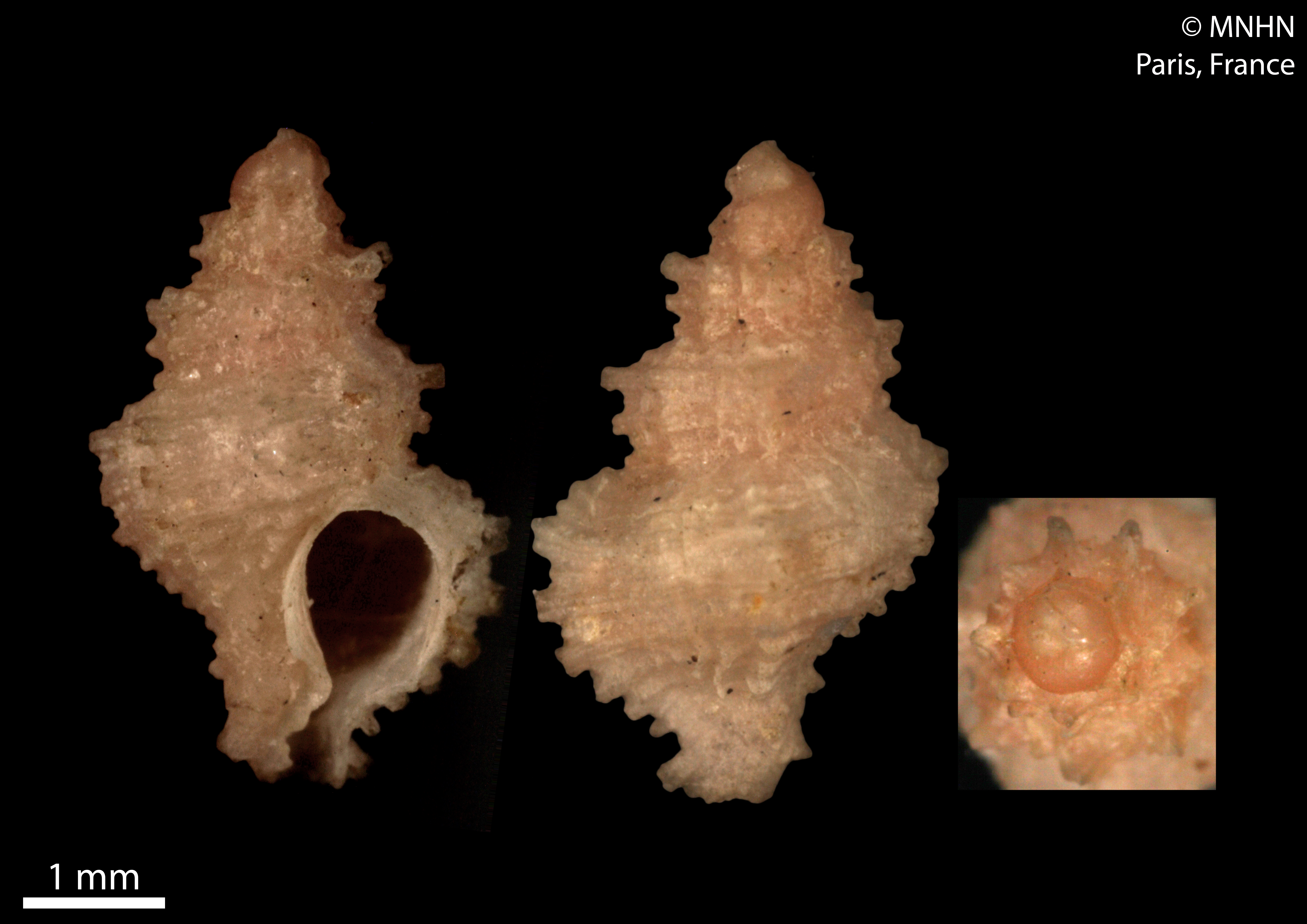
- Shell of Favartia paulmieri (specimen at MNHN, Paris)

Scientific classification
- Kingdom: Animalia
- Phylum: Mollusca
- Class: Gastropoda
- Subclass: Caenogastropoda
- Order: Neogastropoda
- Family: Muricidae
- Genus: Favartia
- Species: F. paulmieri

Binomial name
- Favartia paulmieri Houart, 2002

Synonyms
- Favartia (Favartia) paulmieri Houart, 2002· accepted, alternate representation (basionym)

= Favartia paulmieri =

Species of gastropod

Favartia paulmieri is a species of sea snail, a marine gastropod mollusk in the family Muricidae, the murex snails or rock snails.

== Description ==
F. paulmieri differs from F. glypta in its weaker, sparser spiral cords, shorter siphonal canal, and less pronounced varical spines. It shares overall shape with F. levicula, but differs in its pronounced spiral cords and larger protoconch. It differs from F. minirosea in its more spinose and distant axial varices.

The species was named after malacologist Gérard Paulmier, who donated the holotype and made notable contributions to the study of the genus Olivella.

== Distribution ==
This marine species occurs in the Caribbean Sea, on the insular shelf of Martinique. It has also been found in the waters around Guadeloupe.
