= F. exigua =

F. exigua may refer to:

- Favartia exigua, a sea snail
- Fulgoraecia exigua, a planthopper parasite moth
