= F. maculata =

F. maculata may refer to:

- Fabraea maculata, a plant pathogen
- Favartia maculata, a rock snail
- Fodinoidea maculata, a Malagasy moth
