= Favartia isabelae =

Scientific classification
- Kingdom: Animalia
- Phylum: Mollusca
- Class: Gastropoda
- Subclass: Caenogastropoda
- Order: Neogastropoda
- Family: Muricidae
- Genus: Favartia
- Species: F. isabelae

Binomial name
- Favartia isabelae Houart & Rosado, 2008

Species of gastropod

Favartia isabelae is a species of sea snail, a marine gastropod mollusc in the family Muricidae, the murex snails or rock snails.
