= Favartia peregrina =

Scientific classification
- Kingdom: Animalia
- Phylum: Mollusca
- Class: Gastropoda
- Subclass: Caenogastropoda
- Order: Neogastropoda
- Family: Muricidae
- Genus: Favartia
- Species: F. peregrina

Binomial name
- Favartia peregrina (Olivera, 1980)

Synonyms
- Murexiella peregrina Olivera, 1980

Species of gastropod

Favartia peregrina is a species of sea snail, a marine gastropod mollusk in the family Muricidae, the murex snails or rock snails.

== Description ==
This species attains a size of 15 mm.

== Distribution ==
Pacific Ocean: Philippines.
