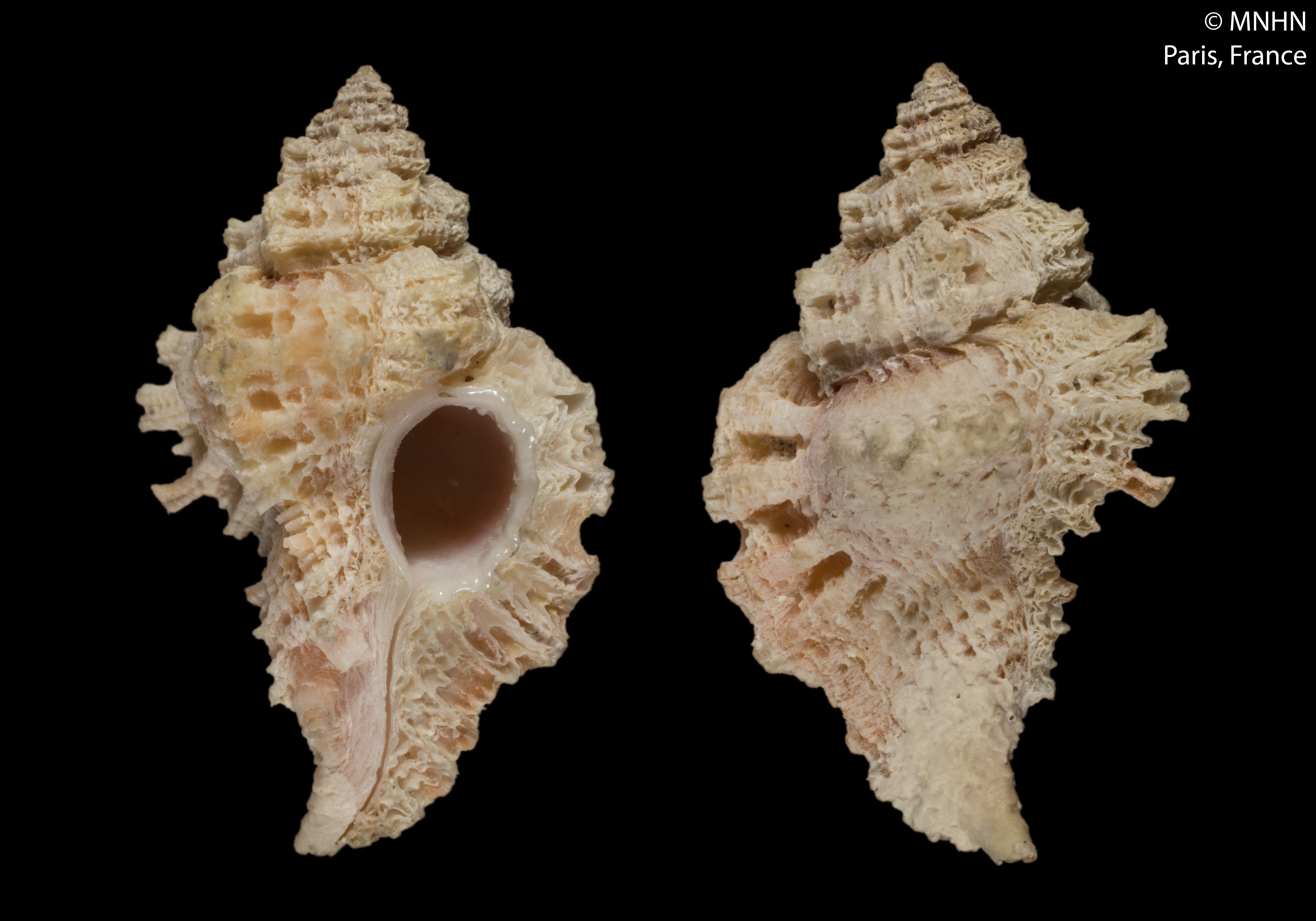
- Shell of Favartia salvati (paratype at MNHN, Paris)

Scientific classification
- Kingdom: Animalia
- Phylum: Mollusca
- Class: Gastropoda
- Subclass: Caenogastropoda
- Order: Neogastropoda
- Family: Muricidae
- Genus: Favartia
- Species: F. salvati

Binomial name
- Favartia salvati Houart & Tröndlé, 2008

Synonyms
- Favartia (Favartia) salvati Houart & Tröndlé, 2008· accepted, alternate representation

= Favartia salvati =

Species of gastropod

Favartia salvati is a species of sea snail, a marine gastropod mollusc in the family Muricidae, the murex snails or rock snails.

== Distribution ==
This marine species occurs in the Austral Archipelago, French Polynesia.
