= Favartia kalafuti =

Scientific classification
- Kingdom: Animalia
- Phylum: Mollusca
- Class: Gastropoda
- Subclass: Caenogastropoda
- Order: Neogastropoda
- Family: Muricidae
- Genus: Favartia
- Species: F. kalafuti

Binomial name
- Favartia kalafuti (Petuch, 1987)

Synonyms
- Murexiella kalafuti Petuch, 1987

Species of gastropod

Favartia kalafuti is a species of sea snail, a marine gastropod mollusk in the family Muricidae, the murex snails or rock snails.

== Description ==
Original description: "Shell small for genus, fusiform, with elevated spire; 6 varices per whorl; shoulder sharp-angled; body whorl with 5 large cords; cords end in thick, blunt spines at intersections with varix; cords minutely fimbriated; varices heavily fimbriated; shell grayish-white with 2 wide, dark brown bands, one around mid-body and one around siphonal canal; suture marked with row of intermittent dark brown patches; siphonal canal with 2 large cords, producing 2 large spines at intersection with varix; aperture ovate, large in proportion to shell size; dark mid-body band showing through in aperture."

== Distribution ==
Locus typicus: "(Dredged from) 150 metres depth 50 kilometres South of Apalachicola, Florida, USA."
