= Favartia confusa =

Scientific classification
- Kingdom: Animalia
- Phylum: Mollusca
- Class: Gastropoda
- Subclass: Caenogastropoda
- Order: Neogastropoda
- Family: Muricidae
- Genus: Favartia
- Species: F. confusa

Binomial name
- Favartia confusa (Brazier, 1877)

Synonyms
- Murex confusa Brazier, 1877

Species of gastropod

Favartia confusa is a species of sea snail, a marine gastropod mollusk in the family Muricidae, the murex snails or rock snails.
