= Favartia minuscula =

Favartia paulskoglundi

Scientific classification
- Kingdom: Animalia
- Phylum: Mollusca
- Class: Gastropoda
- Subclass: Caenogastropoda
- Order: Neogastropoda
- Family: Muricidae
- Genus: Favartia
- Species: F. minuscula

Binomial name
- Favartia minuscula (M. Smith, 1947)

Synonyms
- List: Favartia (Favartia) paulskoglundi Hertz & Myers, 1998; Favartia (Murexiella) paulskoglundi Hertz & Myers, 1998; Favartia paulskoglundi Hertz & Myers, 1998; Murex vittatus minusculus M. Smith, 1947

Species of gastropod

Favartia minuscula is a species of sea snail, a marine gastropod mollusc in the family Muricidae, the murex snails or rock snails.
