= Favartia iredalei =

Scientific classification
- Kingdom: Animalia
- Phylum: Mollusca
- Class: Gastropoda
- Subclass: Caenogastropoda
- Order: Neogastropoda
- Family: Muricidae
- Genus: Favartia
- Species: F. iredalei

Binomial name
- Favartia iredalei Ponder, 1972

Synonyms
- Favartia (Murexiella) iredalei Ponder, 1972; Murexiella iredalei (Ponder, 1972)

Species of gastropod

Holotype site: Lord Howe Island

Favartia iredalei is a species of sea snail, a marine gastropod mollusk in the family Muricidae, the murex snails or rock snails, first described by Winston Ponder in 1972. The species epithet, iredalei, honours Tom Iredale.
