= Favartia humilis =

Scientific classification
- Kingdom: Animalia
- Phylum: Mollusca
- Class: Gastropoda
- Subclass: Caenogastropoda
- Order: Neogastropoda
- Family: Muricidae
- Genus: Favartia
- Species: F. humilis

Binomial name
- Favartia humilis (Broderip, 1833)

Synonyms
- Murex fricki Crosse, 1865; Murex humilis Broderip, 1833; Murex obtusus Sowerby, 1879; Murex octogonus Sowerby, 1860; Murex sowerbyi Kobelt, 1877; Murex taeniatus Sowerby, 1860

Species of gastropod

Favartia humilis is a species of sea snail, a marine gastropod mollusk in the family Muricidae, the murex snails or rock snails.
