= Favartia brazieri =

Scientific classification
- Kingdom: Animalia
- Phylum: Mollusca
- Class: Gastropoda
- Subclass: Caenogastropoda
- Order: Neogastropoda
- Family: Muricidae
- Genus: Favartia
- Species: F. brazieri

Binomial name
- Favartia brazieri (Angas, 1878)

Synonyms
- Murex brazieri Angas, 1878; Trophon tumida Petterd, 1884

Species of gastropod

Favartia brazieri is a species of sea snail, a marine gastropod mollusk in the family Muricidae, the murex snails or rock snails.
