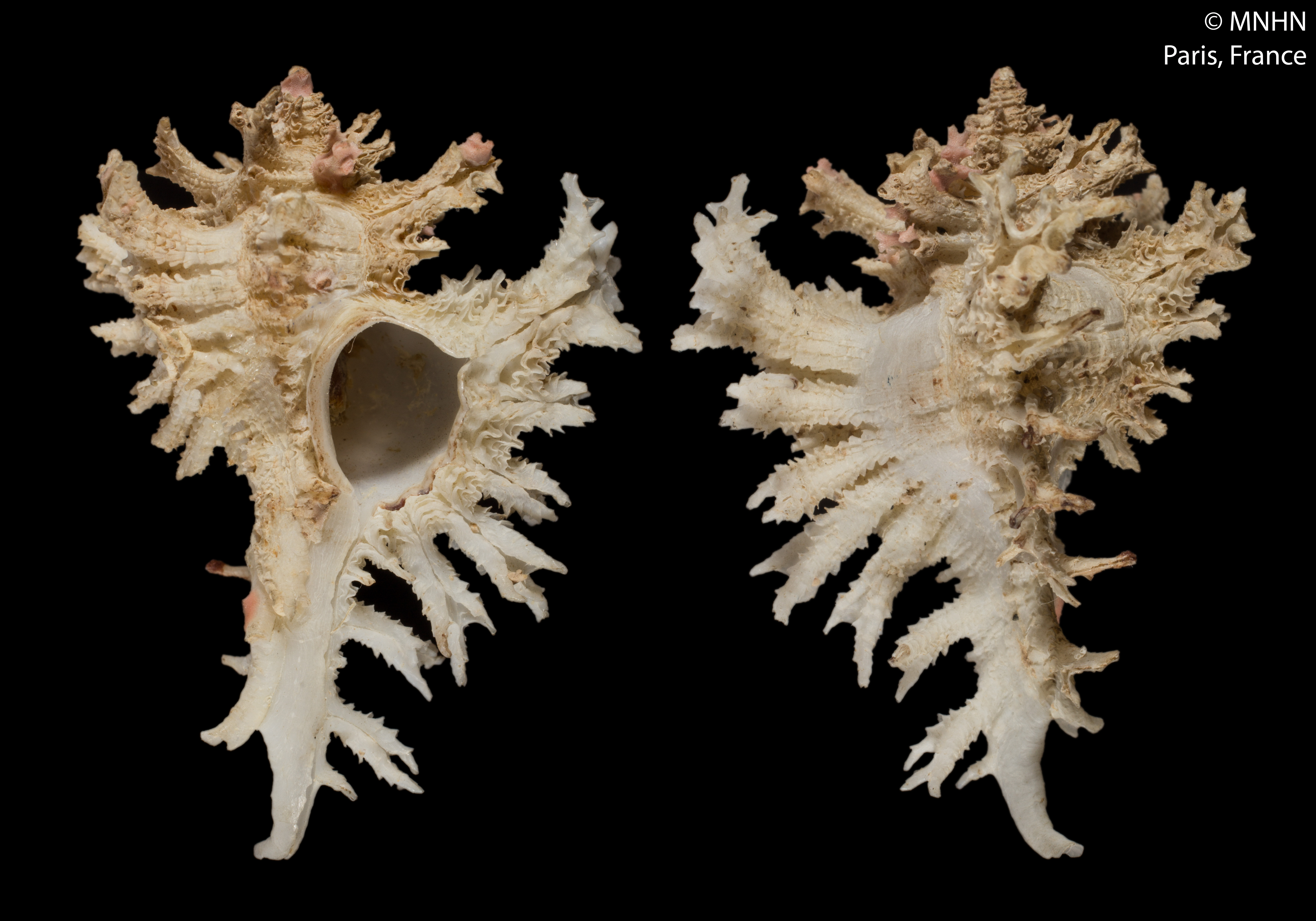

Scientific classification
- Kingdom: Animalia
- Phylum: Mollusca
- Class: Gastropoda
- Subclass: Caenogastropoda
- Order: Neogastropoda
- Family: Muricidae
- Genus: Favartia
- Species: F. bojadorensis

Binomial name
- Favartia bojadorensis (Locard, 1897)

Synonyms
- Favartia (Murexiella) bojadorensis (Locard, 1897)· accepted, alternate representation; Hexaplex bojadorensis (Locard, 1897); Murex asteriae Nicolay, 1972; Murex bojadorensis Locard, 1897; Murexiella asteriae Nicolay, 1972; Murexiella bojadorensis (Locard, 1897)

= Favartia bojadorensis =

Species of gastropod

Favartia bojadorensis, commonly known as the Bojador murex, is a species of sea snail, a marine gastropod mollusk in the family Muricidae, the murex snails or rock snails.

== Description ==
The shell size varies between 30 mm and 100 mm. The species, originally called Murex bojadorensis, was described by Locard in 1897.

== Distribution ==
This species occurs in European waters and in the Atlantic Ocean off the Canary Islands, Ghana and Angola.
