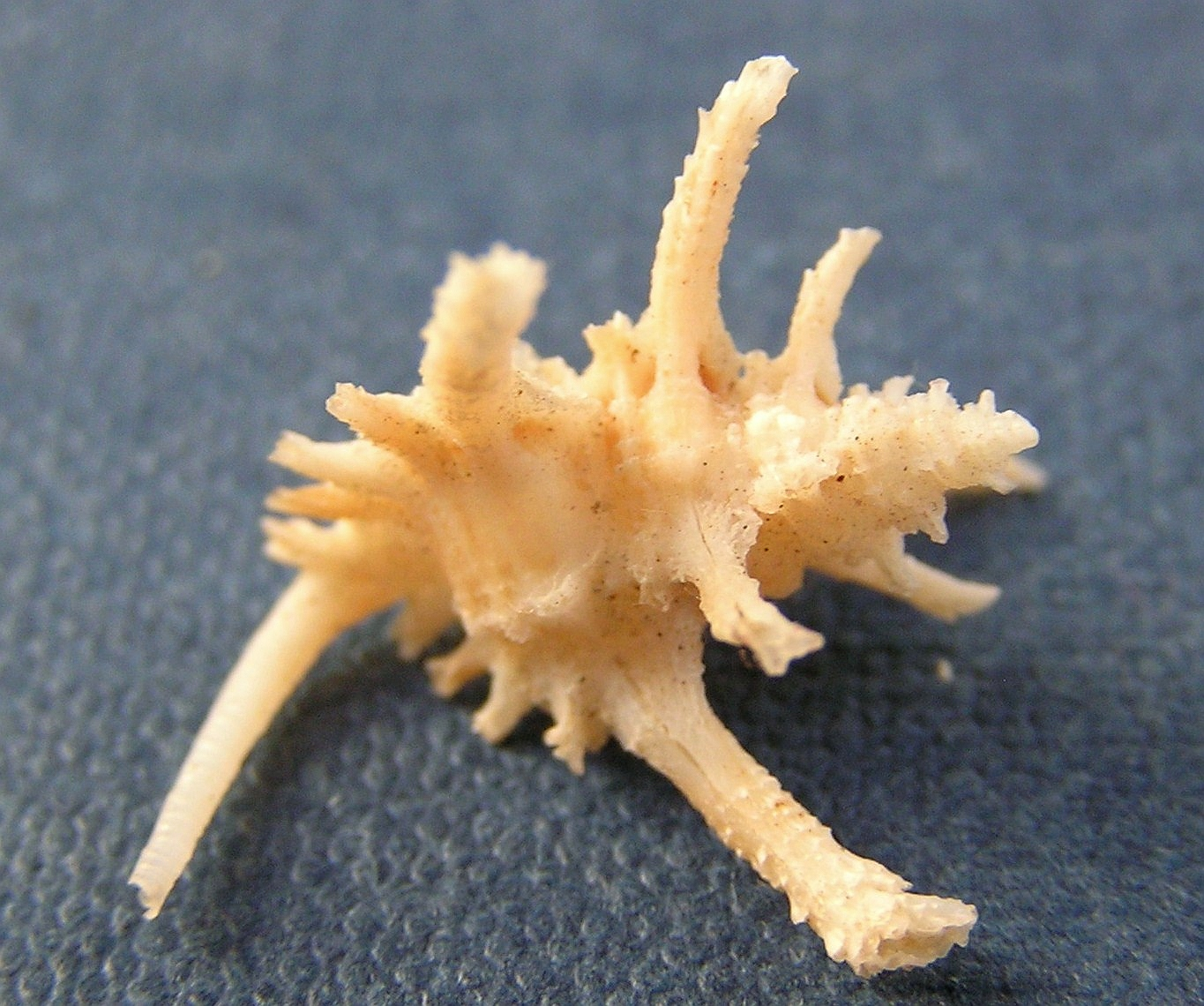
- Favartia (Favartia) martini

Scientific classification
- Kingdom: Animalia
- Phylum: Mollusca
- Class: Gastropoda
- Subclass: Caenogastropoda
- Order: Neogastropoda
- Family: Muricidae
- Genus: Favartia
- Species: F. martini

Binomial name
- Favartia martini (Shikama, 1977)

Synonyms
- Murexiella martini Shikama, 1977

= Favartia martini =

Favartia (Favartia) martini

Species of gastropod

Favartia martini is a species of sea snail, a marine gastropod mollusk in the family Muricidae, the murex snails or rock snails.
