= Favartia minatauros =

Scientific classification
- Kingdom: Animalia
- Phylum: Mollusca
- Class: Gastropoda
- Subclass: Caenogastropoda
- Order: Neogastropoda
- Family: Muricidae
- Genus: Favartia
- Species: F. minatauros

Binomial name
- Favartia minatauros Radwin & D'Attilio, 1976

Synonyms
- Murex obtusus Sowerby, 1894

Species of gastropod

Favartia minatauros is a species of sea snail, a marine gastropod mollusk in the family Muricidae, the murex snails or rock snails.
