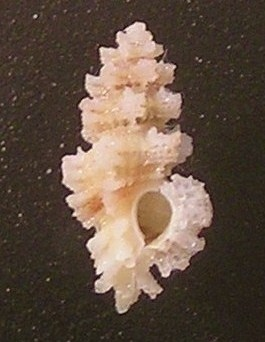
- Favartia guamensis

Scientific classification
- Kingdom: Animalia
- Phylum: Mollusca
- Class: Gastropoda
- Subclass: Caenogastropoda
- Order: Neogastropoda
- Family: Muricidae
- Genus: Favartia
- Species: F. guamensis

Binomial name
- Favartia guamensis Emerson & D'Attilio, 1979

= Favartia guamensis =

Species of gastropod

Favartia guamensis is a species of sea snail, a marine gastropod mollusk in the family Muricidae, the murex snails or rock snails.
