= Favartia natalensis =

Scientific classification
- Kingdom: Animalia
- Phylum: Mollusca
- Class: Gastropoda
- Subclass: Caenogastropoda
- Order: Neogastropoda
- Family: Muricidae
- Genus: Favartia
- Species: F. natalensis

Binomial name
- Favartia natalensis (E. A. Smith, 1906)

Synonyms
- Favartia natalensis (E. A. Smith, 1906); Ocinebra natalensis E. A. Smith, 1906

Species of gastropod

Favartia natalensis is a species of sea snail, a marine gastropod mollusk in the family Muricidae, the murex snails or rock snails.

== Distribution ==
Specimen collections and observations of Favartia natalensis have occurred along the Eastern South-African coast by E. A. Smith noted in 1906, with five such occurrences between Durban and East London. Their habitat is in the Marine Benthic Zone at latitude 32.1667°S and longitude 28.9667°E.
