= Favartia concavoptera =

Scientific classification
- Kingdom: Animalia
- Phylum: Mollusca
- Class: Gastropoda
- Subclass: Caenogastropoda
- Order: Neogastropoda
- Family: Muricidae
- Genus: Favartia
- Species: F. concavoptera

Binomial name
- Favartia concavoptera (Kosuge, 1980)

Synonyms
- Pterynotus concavopterus Kosuge, 1980 (basionym); Timbellus concavopterus (Kosuge, 1980) superseded combination

Species of gastropod

Favartia concavoptera is a species of sea snail, a marine gastropod mollusk in the family Muricidae, the murex snails or rock snails.

== Description ==
The shell grows to a length of 22 mm.

== Distribution ==
This species occurs in the Pacific Ocean off the Philippines.
