= Favartia keenae =

Scientific classification
- Kingdom: Animalia
- Phylum: Mollusca
- Class: Gastropoda
- Subclass: Caenogastropoda
- Order: Neogastropoda
- Family: Muricidae
- Genus: Favartia
- Species: F. keenae

Binomial name
- Favartia keenae (Vokes, 1970)

Synonyms
- Murexiella keenae Vokes, 1970

Species of gastropod

Favartia keenae is a species of sea snail, a marine gastropod mollusk in the family Muricidae, the murex snails or rock snails.
