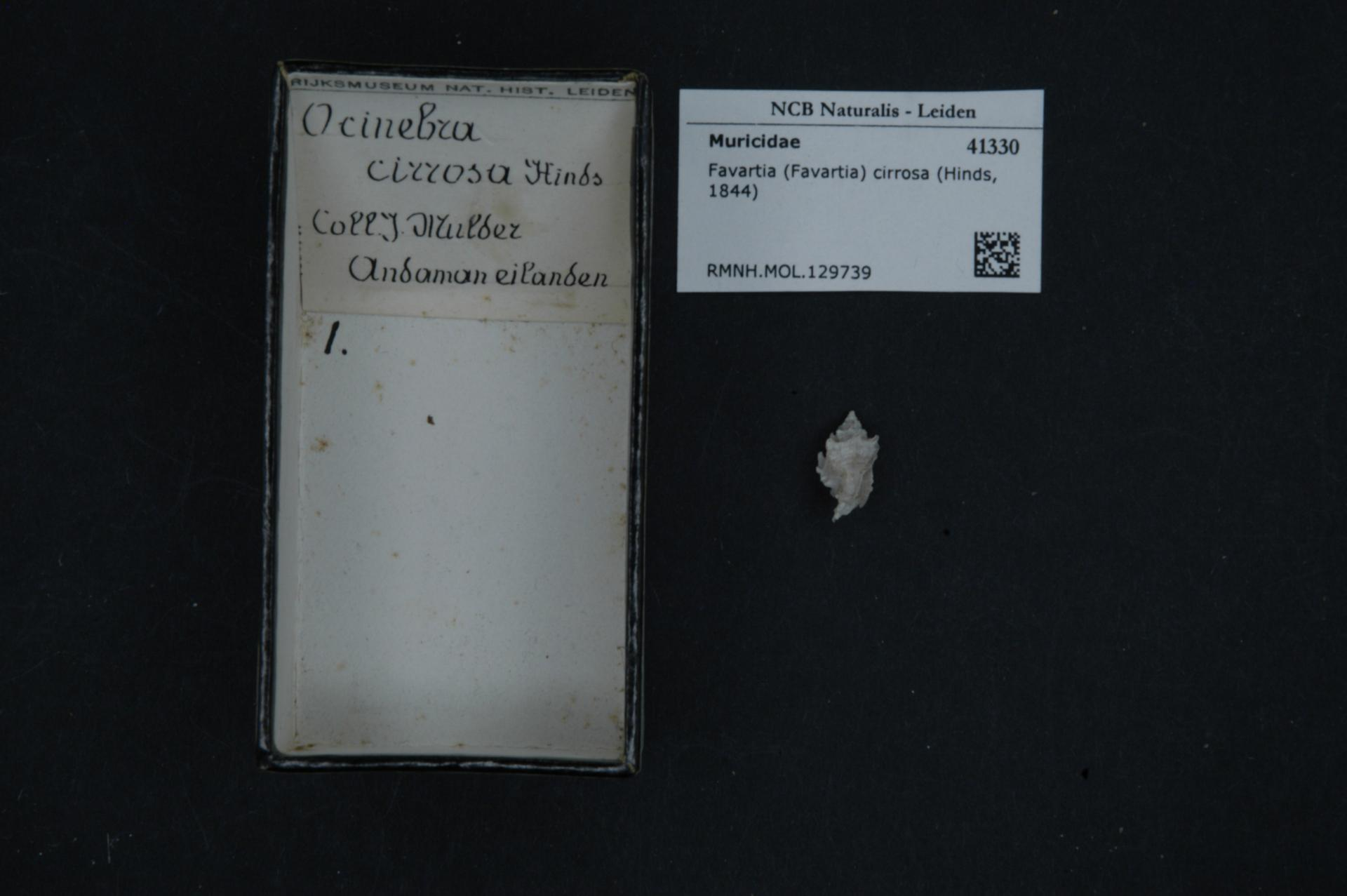

Scientific classification
- Kingdom: Animalia
- Phylum: Mollusca
- Class: Gastropoda
- Subclass: Caenogastropoda
- Order: Neogastropoda
- Family: Muricidae
- Genus: Favartia
- Species: F. cirrosa

Binomial name
- Favartia cirrosa (Hinds, 1844)

Synonyms
- Murex cirrosus Hinds, 1844

= Favartia cirrosa =

Species of gastropod

Favartia cirrosa is a species of sea snail, a marine gastropod mollusk in the family Muricidae, the murex snails or rock snails.
