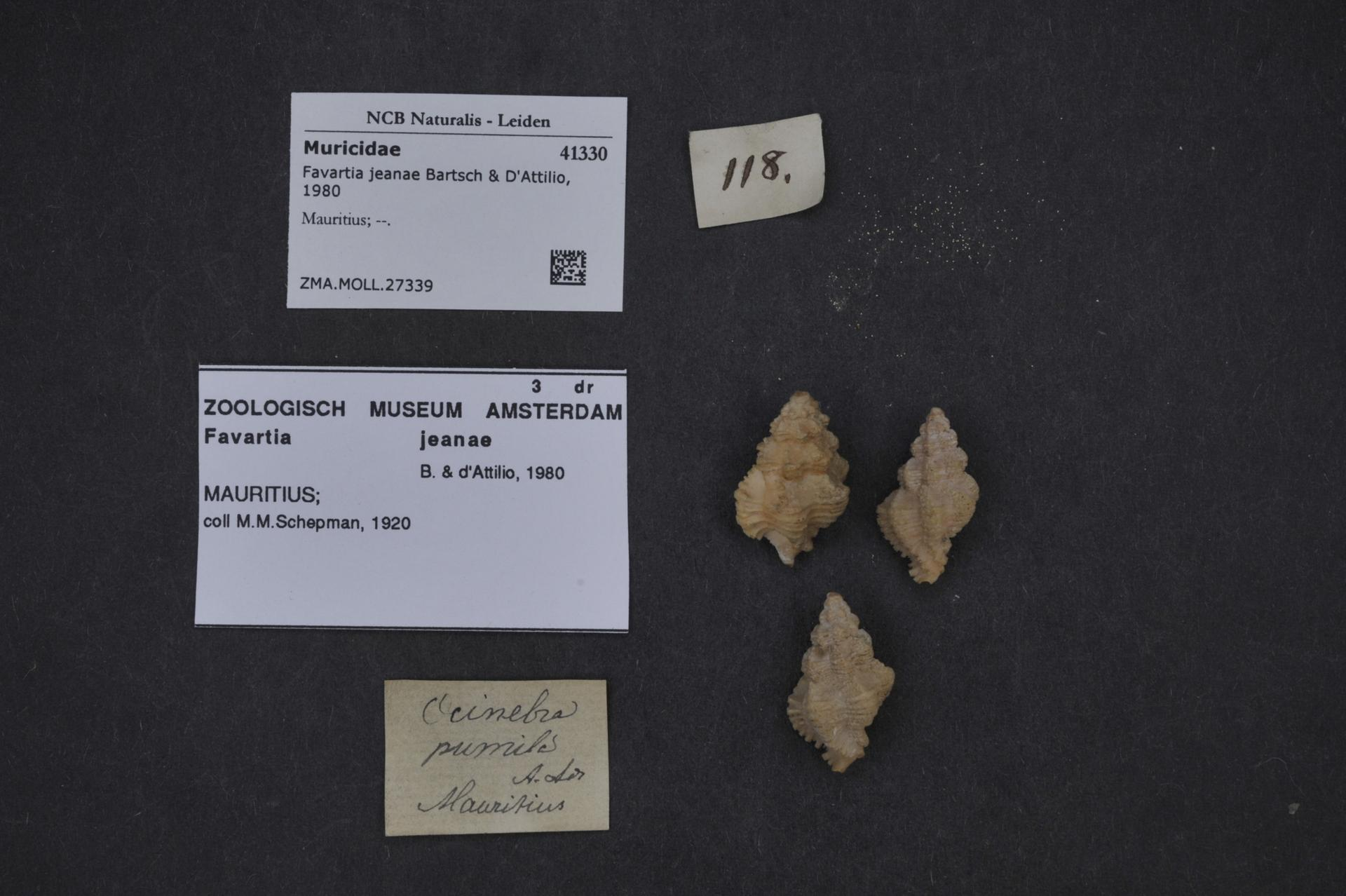

Scientific classification
- Kingdom: Animalia
- Phylum: Mollusca
- Class: Gastropoda
- Subclass: Caenogastropoda
- Order: Neogastropoda
- Family: Muricidae
- Genus: Favartia
- Species: F. jeanae

Binomial name
- Favartia jeanae Bartsch & D'Attilio, 1980

Synonyms
- Favartia jeanae Bertsch & D'Attilio, 1980; Murex pumilus A. Adams, 1854

= Favartia jeanae =

Species of gastropod

Favartia jeanae is a species of sea snail, a marine gastropod mollusk in the family Muricidae, the murex snails or rock snails.
