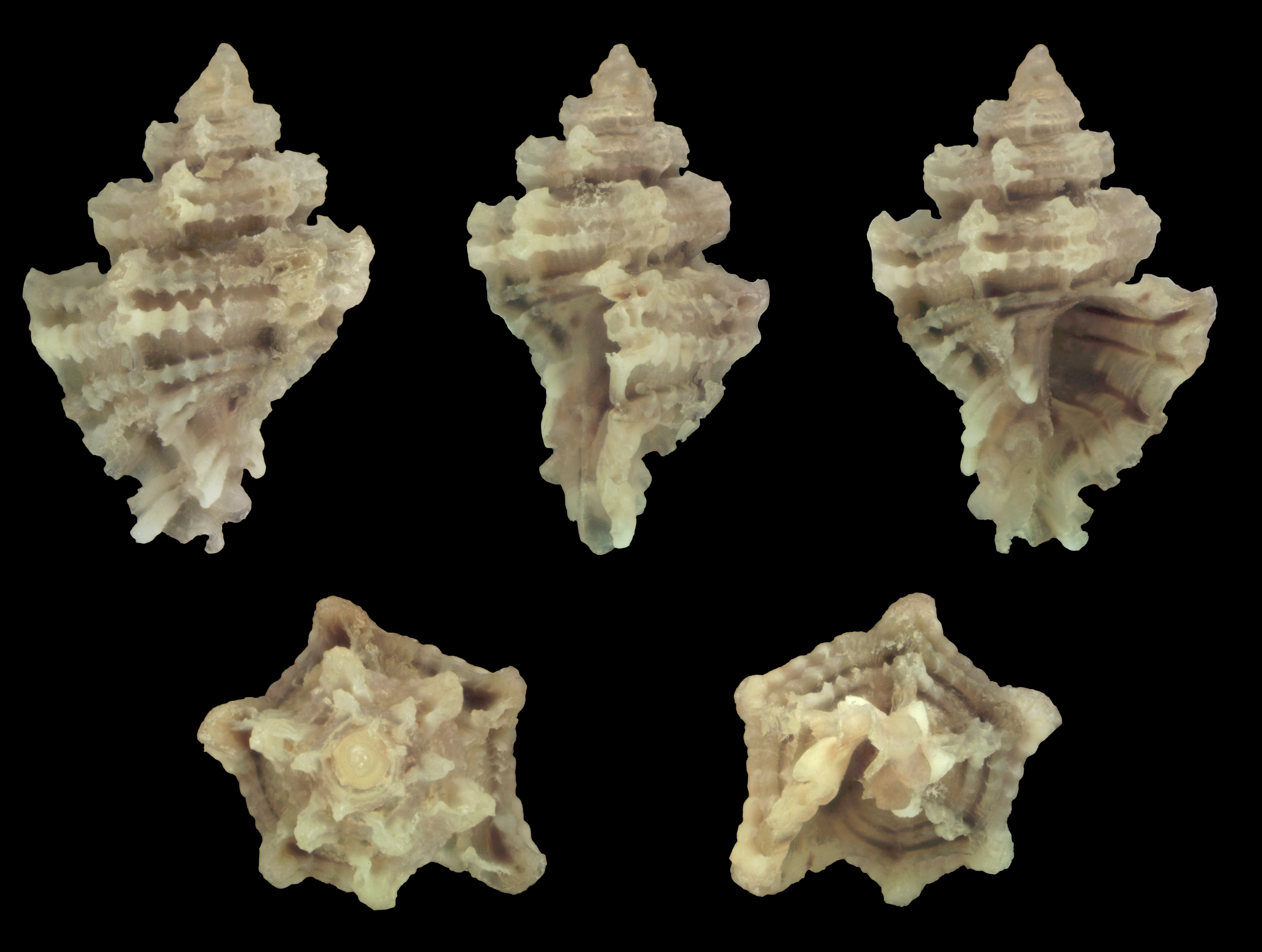

Scientific classification
- Kingdom: Animalia
- Phylum: Mollusca
- Class: Gastropoda
- Subclass: Caenogastropoda
- Order: Neogastropoda
- Family: Muricidae
- Genus: Favartia
- Species: F. rosamiae

Binomial name
- Favartia rosamiae D'Attilio & Myers, 1985

Synonyms
- Favartia (Murexiella) rosamiae D'Attilio & Myers, 1985

= Favartia rosamiae =

Species of sea snail

Favartia rosamiae is a species of sea snail, a marine gastropod mollusk in the family Muricidae, the murex snails or rock snails.

== Description ==
Shell size 11 mm.

== Distribution ==
Queensland, Australia.
