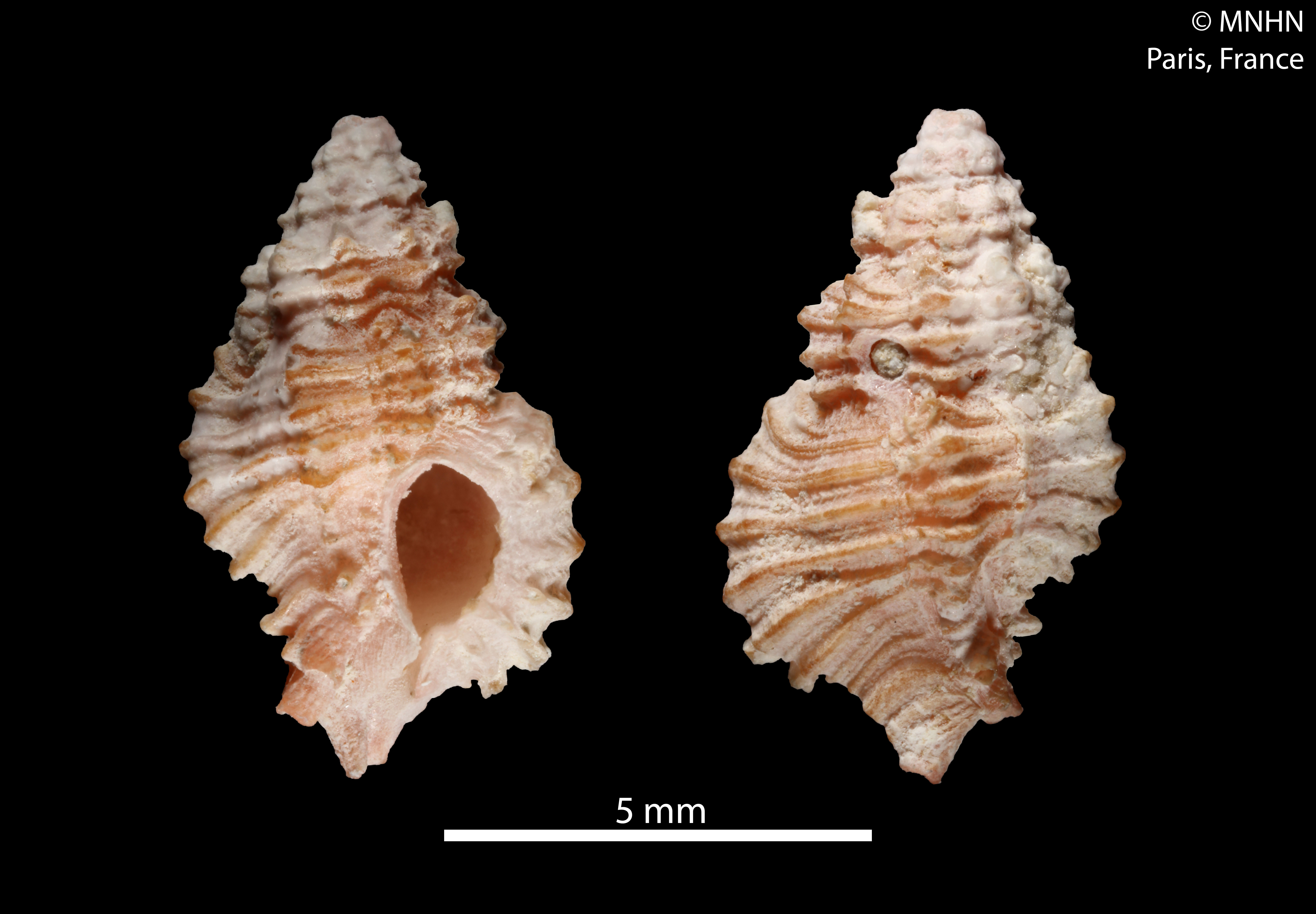

Scientific classification
- Kingdom: Animalia
- Phylum: Mollusca
- Class: Gastropoda
- Subclass: Caenogastropoda
- Order: Neogastropoda
- Family: Muricidae
- Genus: Favartia
- Species: F. varimutabilis

Binomial name
- Favartia varimutabilis Houart, 1991

Synonyms
- Favartia (Favartia) varimutabilis Houart, 1991· accepted, alternate representation (basionym); Favartia martinicaensis Espinosa & Ortea, 2017

= Favartia varimutabilis =

Species of gastropod

Favartia varimutabilis is a species of sea snail, a marine gastropod mollusk in the family Muricidae, the murex snails or rock snails.

== Distribution ==
This species occurs in the Atlantic Ocean off Southeast Brazil.
