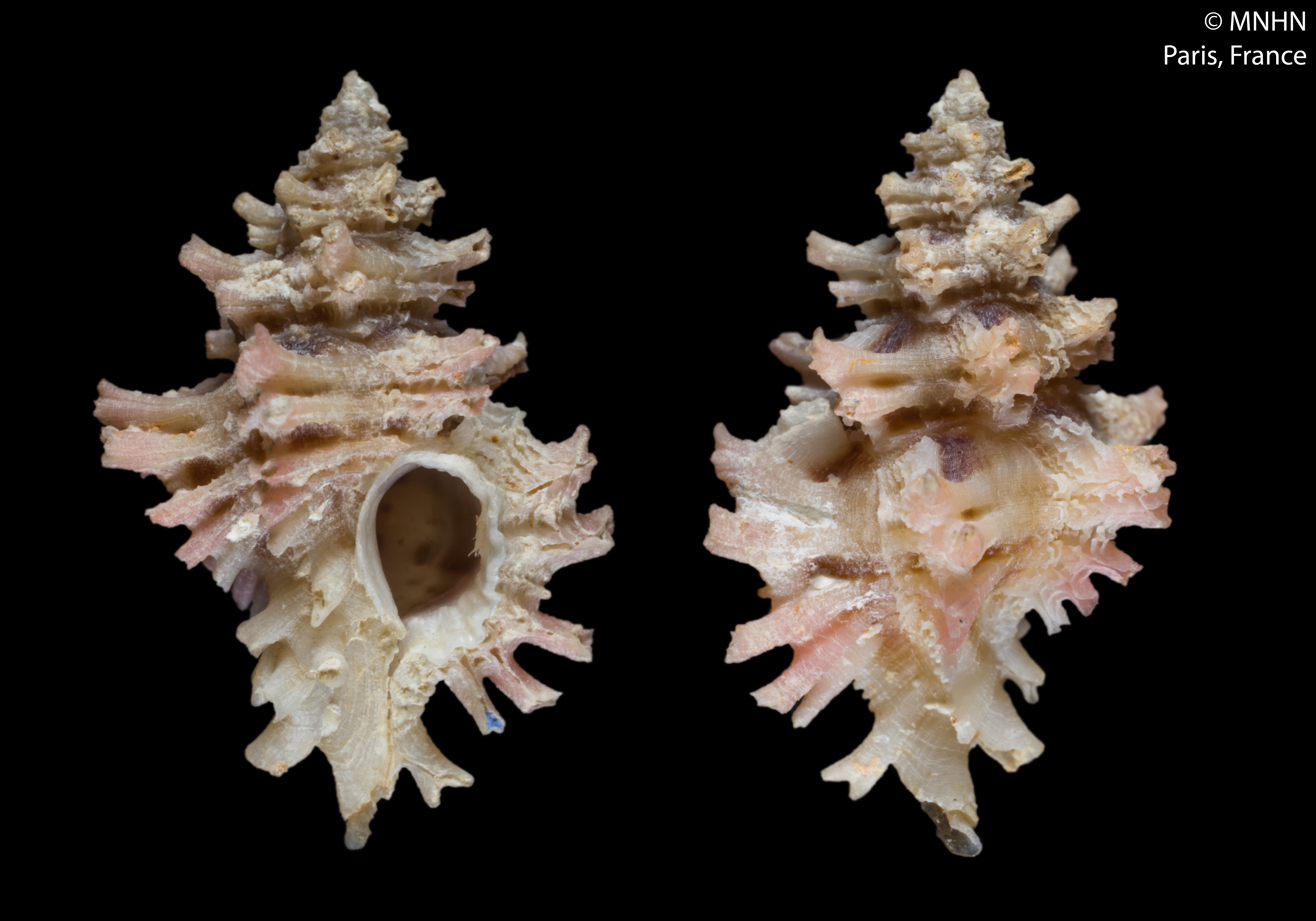

Scientific classification
- Kingdom: Animalia
- Phylum: Mollusca
- Class: Gastropoda
- Subclass: Caenogastropoda
- Order: Neogastropoda
- Family: Muricidae
- Genus: Favartia
- Species: F. conleyi

Binomial name
- Favartia conleyi Houart, 1999

Synonyms
- Favartia (Favartia) conleyi Houart, 1999· accepted, alternate representation; Favartia (Murexiella) lillouxi Myers & Hertz, 1999

= Favartia conleyi =

Species of gastropod

Favartia conleyi is a species of sea snail, a marine gastropod mollusk in the family Muricidae, the murex snails or rock snails.

== Distribution ==
This species occurs in the Pacific Ocean off Guam.
