= Favartia flexirostris =

Scientific classification
- Kingdom: Animalia
- Phylum: Mollusca
- Class: Gastropoda
- Subclass: Caenogastropoda
- Order: Neogastropoda
- Family: Muricidae
- Genus: Favartia
- Species: F. flexirostris

Binomial name
- Favartia flexirostris (Melvill, 1898)

Synonyms
- Murex flexirostris Melvill, 1898

Species of gastropod

Favartia flexirostris is a species of sea snail, a marine gastropod mollusk in the family Muricidae, the murex snails or rock snails.
