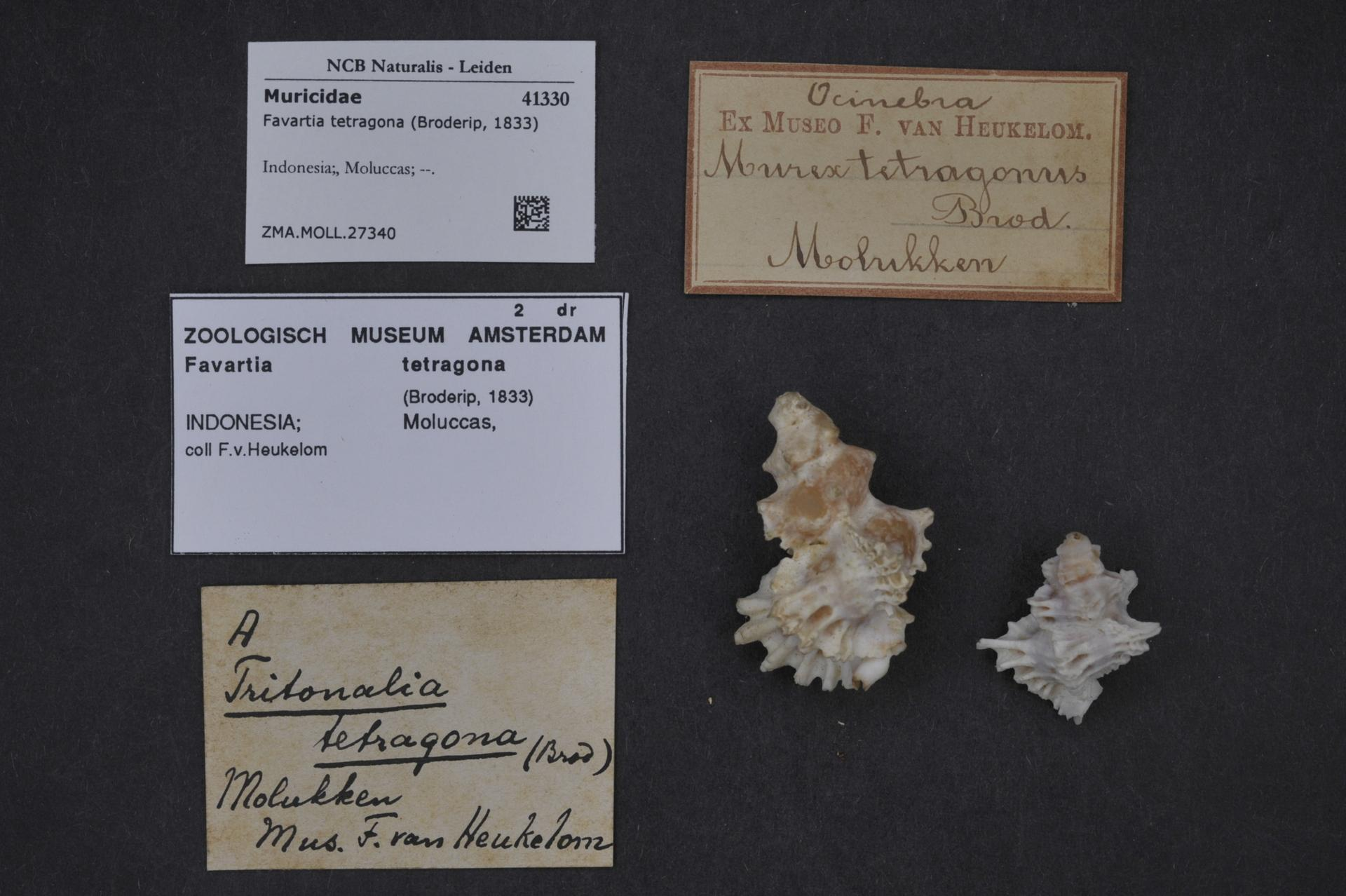

Scientific classification
- Kingdom: Animalia
- Phylum: Mollusca
- Class: Gastropoda
- Subclass: Caenogastropoda
- Order: Neogastropoda
- Family: Muricidae
- Genus: Favartia
- Species: F. tetragona

Binomial name
- Favartia tetragona (Broderip, 1833)

Synonyms
- Favartia trivaricosa D'Attilio & Myers, 1986; Murex tetragonus Broderip, 1833

= Favartia tetragona =

Species of gastropod

Favartia tetragona is a species of sea snail, a marine gastropod mollusk in the family Muricidae, the murex snails or rock snails.
