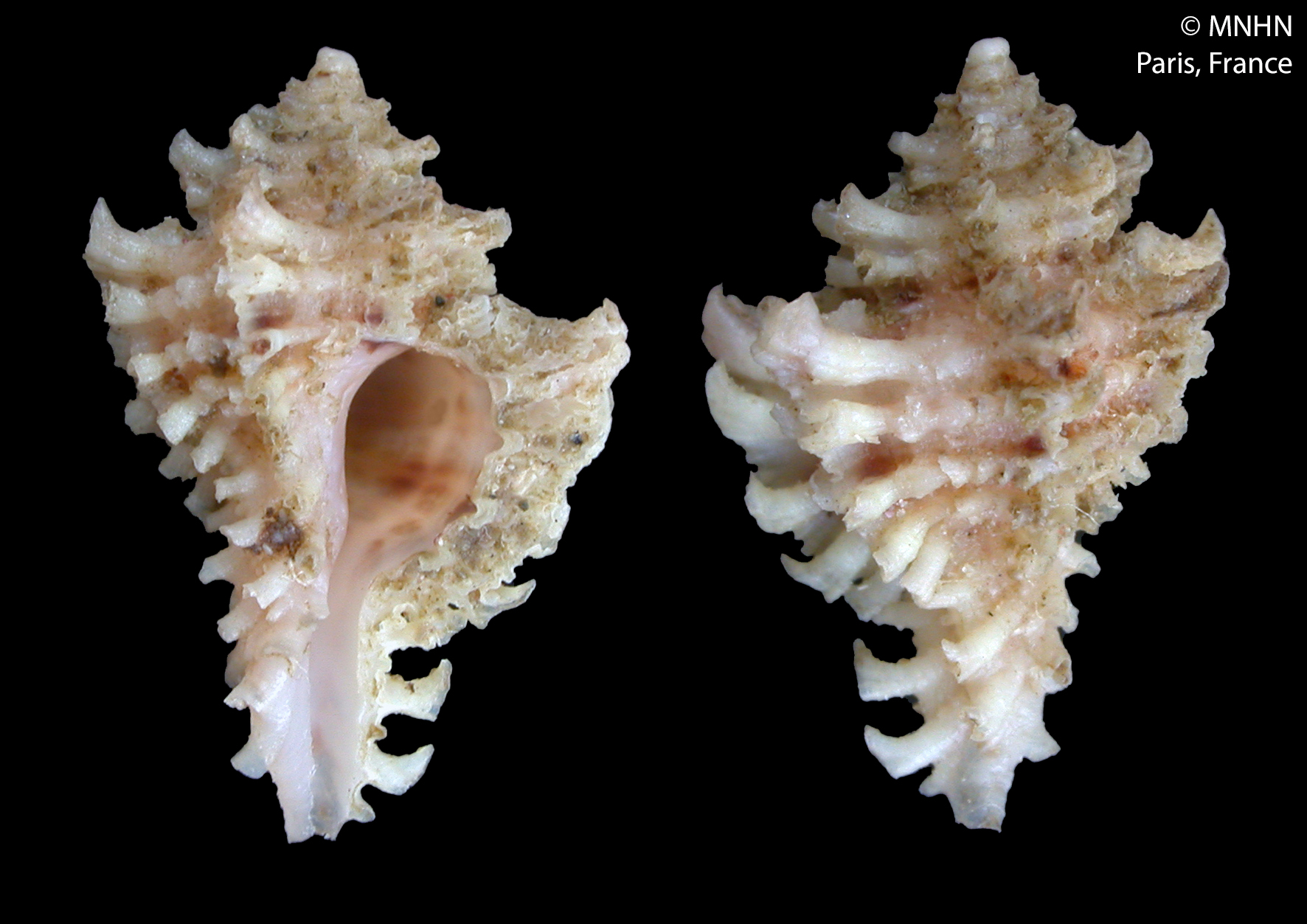
- Shell of Favartia macgintyi (specimen at MNHN, Paris)

Scientific classification
- Kingdom: Animalia
- Phylum: Mollusca
- Class: Gastropoda
- Subclass: Caenogastropoda
- Order: Neogastropoda
- Family: Muricidae
- Genus: Favartia
- Species: F. macgintyi

Binomial name
- Favartia macgintyi (M. Smith, 1938)

Synonyms
- † Favartia (Murexiella) macgintyi (M. Smith, 1938) · accepted, alternate representation; Murex macgintyi M. Smith, 1938; Murexiella leonardhilli Petuch, 1987; Murexiella macgintyi (M. Smith, 1938)

= Favartia macgintyi =

Extinct species of gastropod

Favartia macgintyi or Murex Macgintyi, common name : McGinty's Murex, is an extinct species of sea snail, a marine gastropod mollusk in the family Muricidae, the murex snails or rock snails.

== Description ==
The shell size varies between 13.4 mm and 44 mm with five whorls and a two whorl shining nucleus which is smooth. There are seven raised spiral ridges with branching recurved terminations.

== Fossil range ==
The real Favartia macgintyi is a late Pliocene and early Pleistocene fossil from the Caloosahatchee formation of southern Florida. The Recent Florida species that has been designated by that name is still unnamed according to Petuch (2013: 199)

== Distribution ==
This species occurs in the Caribbean Sea, the Gulf of Mexico and in the Atlantic Ocean from Florida and the Bahamas to Northeastern Brazil.
