= Favartia sykesi =

Scientific classification
- Kingdom: Animalia
- Phylum: Mollusca
- Class: Gastropoda
- Subclass: Caenogastropoda
- Order: Neogastropoda
- Family: Muricidae
- Genus: Favartia
- Species: F. sykesi

Binomial name
- Favartia sykesi (Preston, 1904)

Synonyms
- Murex sykesi Preston, 1904

Species of gastropod

Favartia sykesi is a species of sea snail, a marine gastropod mollusk in the family Muricidae, the murex snails or rock snails.
