= Favartia brevicula =

Scientific classification
- Kingdom: Animalia
- Phylum: Mollusca
- Class: Gastropoda
- Subclass: Caenogastropoda
- Order: Neogastropoda
- Family: Muricidae
- Genus: Favartia
- Species: F. brevicula

Binomial name
- Favartia brevicula (G. B. Sowerby II, 1834)

Synonyms
- Favartia (Favartia) brevicula (G. B. Sowerby II, 1834) · unaccepted; Favartia robertsoni D'Attilio & B. W. Myers, 1986 · unaccepted (synonym); Murex breviculus G. B. Sowerby II, 1834 · unaccepted (original combination)

Species of gastropod

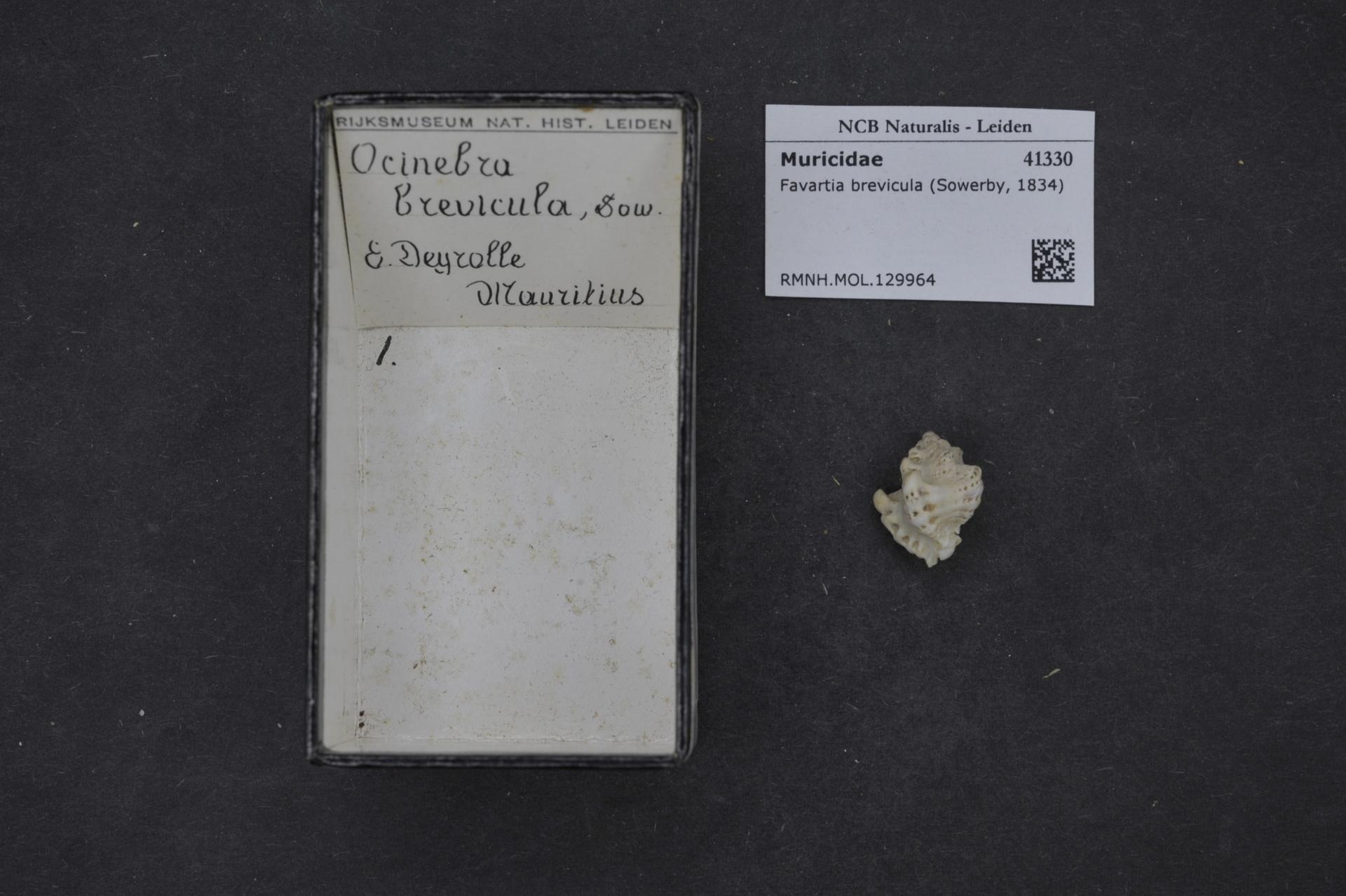
Favartia brevicula shell.

Favartia brevicula is a species of sea snail, a marine gastropod mollusk in the family Muricidae, the murex snails or rock snails. The shell used to belong to the subfamily Muricopsinae, but now belongs to the subfamily Aspellinae.

== Distribution ==
This species distributed in the West Pacific Ocean as well as the Indian Ocean. It was seen in Taiwan, Indonesia, the Philippines, Solomon Islands, and southern Africa. They habitate on shallow seabed.
