= Favartia balteata =

Scientific classification
- Kingdom: Animalia
- Phylum: Mollusca
- Class: Gastropoda
- Subclass: Caenogastropoda
- Order: Neogastropoda
- Family: Muricidae
- Genus: Favartia
- Species: F. balteata

Binomial name
- Favartia balteata (Beck in Sowerby, 1841)

Synonyms
- Homalocantha echiniformis Shikama, 1978; Murex balteata Beck in Sowerby, 1841; Murex crouchi var. rufescens Sowerby, 1894; Murex rusticus Reeve, 1845b Ocinebra fuscofrondosa Schepman, 1911

Species of mollusk

Favartia balteata is a species of sea snail, a marine gastropod mollusk in the family Muricidae, the murex snails or rock snails.
