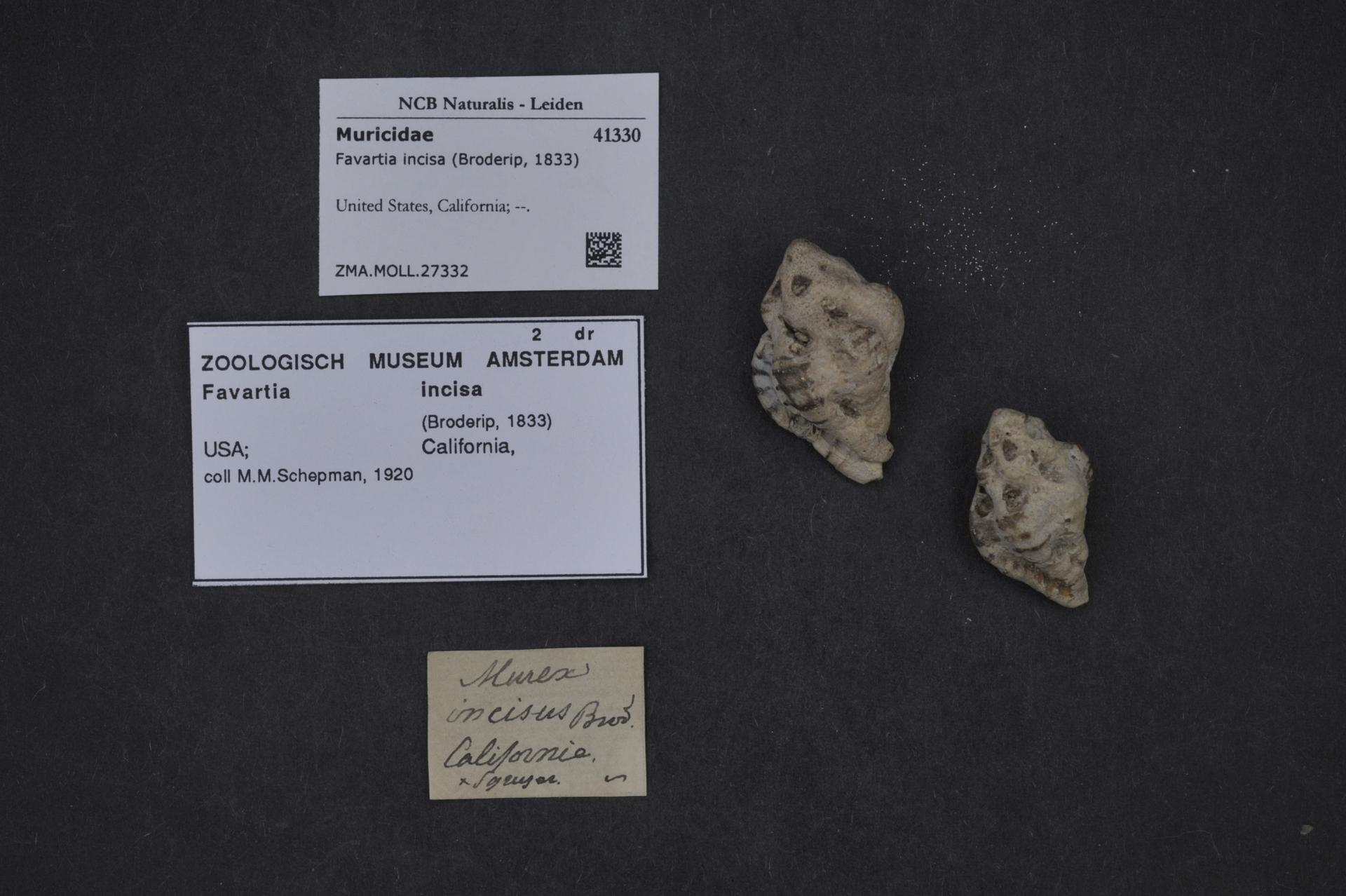

Scientific classification
- Kingdom: Animalia
- Phylum: Mollusca
- Class: Gastropoda
- Subclass: Caenogastropoda
- Order: Neogastropoda
- Family: Muricidae
- Genus: Favartia
- Species: F. incisa

Binomial name
- Favartia incisa (Broderip, 1833)

Synonyms
- Murex angistoma Kuster, 1869; Murex castus A. Adams, 1854; Murex incisa Broderip, 1833; Tritonalia margaritensis Dall in M. Smith, 1939

= Favartia incisa =

Species of gastropod

Favartia incisa is a species of sea snail, a marine gastropod mollusk in the family Muricidae, the murex snails or rock snails.
