= Favartia cellulosa =

Scientific classification
- Kingdom: Animalia
- Phylum: Mollusca
- Class: Gastropoda
- Subclass: Caenogastropoda
- Order: Neogastropoda
- Family: Muricidae
- Genus: Favartia
- Species: F. cellulosa

Binomial name
- Favartia cellulosa (Conrad, 1846)

Synonyms
- Murex cellulosa Conrad, 1846; Murex jamaicensis Sowerby, 1879; Ocenebra (Favartia) alta Dall, 1890

Species of gastropod

Favartia cellulosa is a species of sea snail, a marine gastropod mollusk in the family Muricidae, the murex snails or rock snails.
