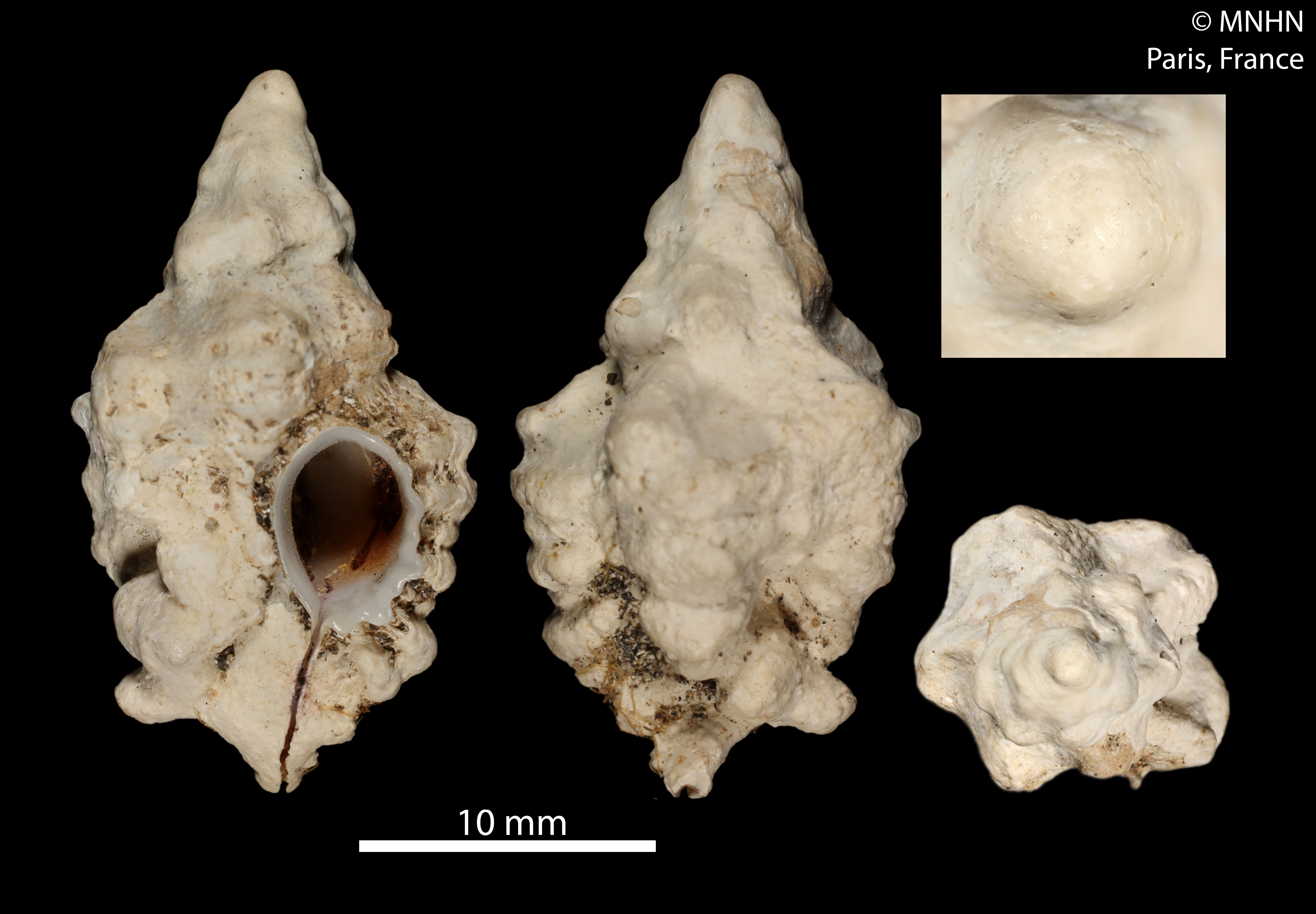

Scientific classification
- Kingdom: Animalia
- Phylum: Mollusca
- Class: Gastropoda
- Subclass: Caenogastropoda
- Order: Neogastropoda
- Family: Muricidae
- Genus: Favartia
- Species: F. burnayi

Binomial name
- Favartia burnayi Houart, 1981

Synonyms
- Favartia (Favartia) burnayi Houart, 1981· accepted, alternate representation; Murex solidus A. Adams, 1853

= Favartia burnayi =

Species of gastropod

Favartia burnayi is a species of sea snail, a marine gastropod mollusk in the family Muricidae, the murex snails or rock snails.

== Distribution ==
They are found in the waters of the Cape Verde Islands.
