= Favartia phantom =

Scientific classification
- Kingdom: Animalia
- Phylum: Mollusca
- Class: Gastropoda
- Subclass: Caenogastropoda
- Order: Neogastropoda
- Family: Muricidae
- Genus: Favartia
- Species: F. phantom

Binomial name
- Favartia phantom (Woolacott, 1957)

Synonyms
- Murex phantom Woolacott, 1957

Species of gastropod

Favartia phantom is a species of sea snail, a marine gastropod mollusk in the family Muricidae, the murex snails or rock snails.
