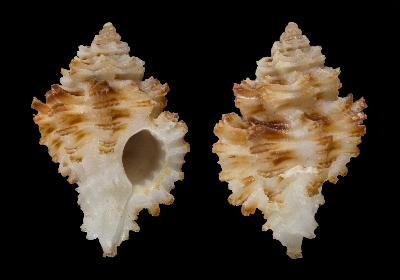
- Shell (holotype in MNHN, Paris)

Scientific classification
- Kingdom: Animalia
- Phylum: Mollusca
- Class: Gastropoda
- Subclass: Caenogastropoda
- Order: Neogastropoda
- Family: Muricidae
- Genus: Favartia
- Species: F. massemini

Binomial name
- Favartia massemini Merle & Garrigues, 2008

Synonyms
- Favartia (Favaertia) massemini Merle & Garrigues, 2008

= Favartia massemini =

Species of gastropod

Favartia massemini is a species of sea snail, a marine gastropod mollusc in the family Muricidae, the murex snails or rock snails.

== Description ==
The length of the shell attains 18 mm.

== Distribution ==
This marine species occurs off the coast of French Guiana and eastern Brazil.
