= Favartia eastorum =

Scientific classification
- Kingdom: Animalia
- Phylum: Mollusca
- Class: Gastropoda
- Subclass: Caenogastropoda
- Order: Neogastropoda
- Family: Muricidae
- Genus: Favartia
- Species: F. eastorum

Binomial name
- Favartia eastorum Houart, 1998

Species of gastropod

Favartia eastorum is a species of sea snail, a marine gastropod mollusk in the family Muricidae, the murex snails or rock snails.
