= Favartia hilli =

Scientific classification
- Kingdom: Animalia
- Phylum: Mollusca
- Class: Gastropoda
- Subclass: Caenogastropoda
- Order: Neogastropoda
- Family: Muricidae
- Genus: Favartia
- Species: F. hilli

Binomial name
- Favartia hilli (Petuch, 1987)

Synonyms
- Murexiella hilli Petuch, 1987

Species of gastropod

Favartia hilli is a species of sea snail, a marine gastropod mollusk in the family Muricidae, the murex snails or rock snails.

== Description ==
Original description: "Shell large for genus, globose, with inflated whorls and rounded shoulder; spire moderately elevated; siphonal canal long, straight; aperture large in proportion to shell size, oval; 8 recurved varices per whorl; body whorl ornamented with 5 large, fimbriated cords between varices; large, recurved, fimbriated spine on varix where intersected by cord; subsutural area flattened, producing stepped spire; spire whorls with 2 fimbriated cords; siphonal canal with 3 large, fimbriated and branching curved spines; 2 smaller spines between 3 siphonal spines; siphonal spines curved posteriorward; color varying from pink to white, salmon (holotype), lavender and dark brown; brown band around subsutural area; siphonal canal generally white."

== Distribution ==
Locus typicus: "Malmok, Aruba Isl., Netherlands Antilles."
