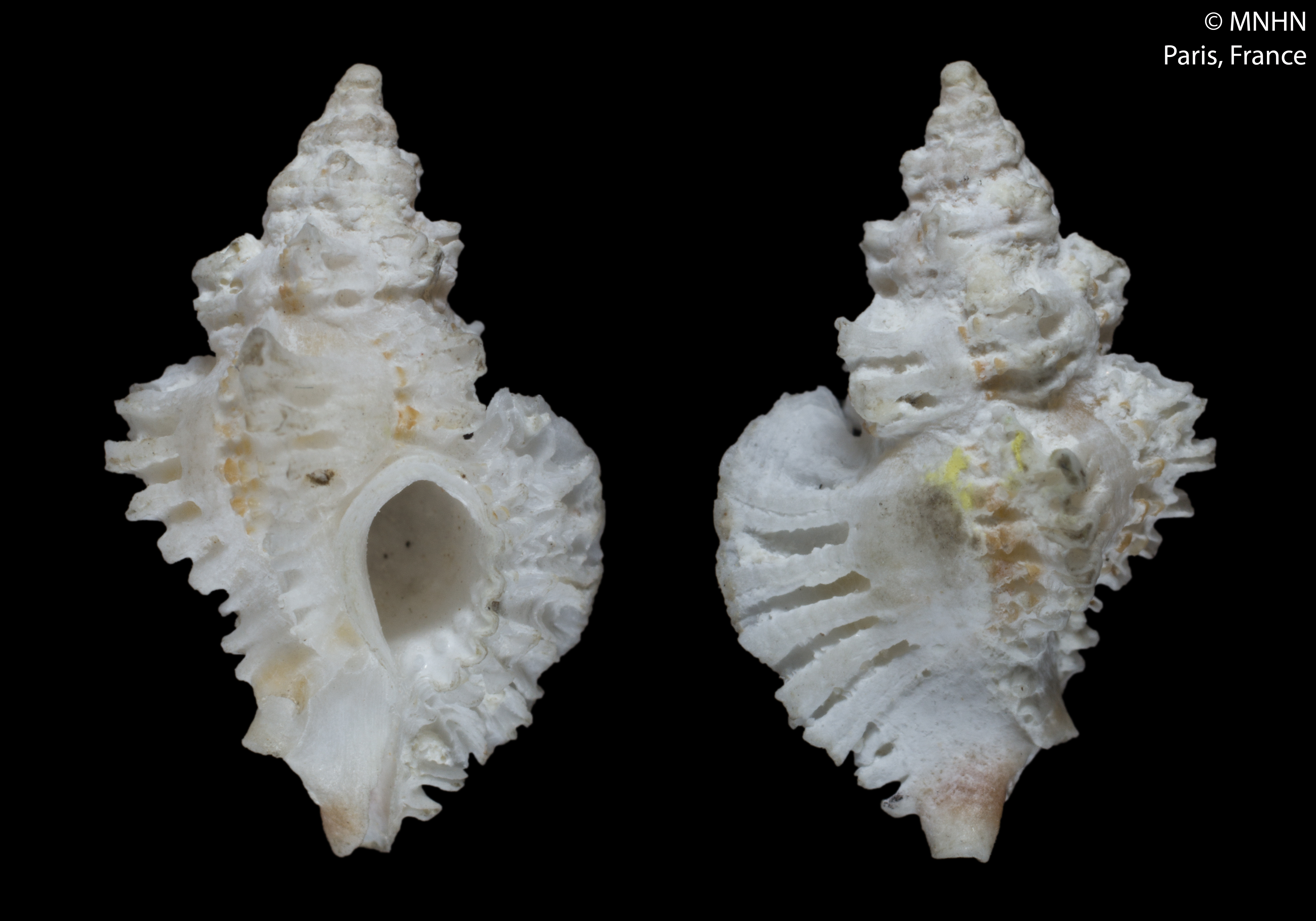
- Shell of Favartia nivea (holotype at MNHN, Paris)

Scientific classification
- Kingdom: Animalia
- Phylum: Mollusca
- Class: Gastropoda
- Subclass: Caenogastropoda
- Order: Neogastropoda
- Family: Muricidae
- Genus: Favartia
- Species: F. nivea

Binomial name
- Favartia nivea Houart & Tröndlé, 2008

Synonyms
- Favartia (Favartia) nivea Houart & Tröndlé, 2008· accepted, alternate representation

= Favartia nivea =

Species of gastropod

Favartia nivea is a species of sea snail, a marine gastropod mollusc in the family Muricidae, the murex snails or rock snails.

== Description ==
The length of the shell attains 11.4 mm.

== Distribution ==
This marine species occurs in the Austral Archipel, French Polynesia.
