= Favartia leonae =

Scientific classification
- Kingdom: Animalia
- Phylum: Mollusca
- Class: Gastropoda
- Subclass: Caenogastropoda
- Order: Neogastropoda
- Family: Muricidae
- Genus: Favartia
- Species: F. leonae

Binomial name
- Favartia leonae D'Attilio & Myers, 1985

Synonyms
- Favartia (Murexiella) leonae D'Attilio & Myers, 1985

Species of gastropod

Favartia leonae is a species of sea snail, a marine gastropod mollusk in the family Muricidae, the murex snails or rock snails.
