= Favartia ponderi =

Scientific classification
- Kingdom: Animalia
- Phylum: Mollusca
- Class: Gastropoda
- Subclass: Caenogastropoda
- Order: Neogastropoda
- Family: Muricidae
- Genus: Favartia
- Species: F. ponderi

Binomial name
- Favartia ponderi Myers & D'Attilio, 1989

Synonyms
- Favartia (Caribiella) ponderi Myers & D'Attilio, 1989

Species of gastropod

Favartia ponderi is a species of sea snail, a marine gastropod mollusk in the family Muricidae, the murex snails or rock snails.
