= Favartia shaskyi =

Scientific classification
- Kingdom: Animalia
- Phylum: Mollusca
- Class: Gastropoda
- Subclass: Caenogastropoda
- Order: Neogastropoda
- Family: Muricidae
- Genus: Favartia
- Species: F. shaskyi

Binomial name
- Favartia shaskyi D'Attilio & Myers, 1988

Species of gastropod

Favartia shaskyi is a species of sea snail, a marine gastropod mollusk in the family Muricidae, the murex snails or rock snails.
