= Favartia lappa =

Scientific classification
- Kingdom: Animalia
- Phylum: Mollusca
- Class: Gastropoda
- Subclass: Caenogastropoda
- Order: Neogastropoda
- Family: Muricidae
- Genus: Favartia
- Species: F. lappa

Binomial name
- Favartia lappa (Broderip, 1833)

Synonyms
- Murex lappa Broderip, 1833; Murex radicatus Hinds, 1844a Murex vittatus minusculus M. Smith, 1947

Species of gastropod

Favartia lappa (Broderip, 1833)

Favartia lappa is a species of sea snail, a marine gastropod mollusk in the family Muricidae, the murex snails or rock snails.
