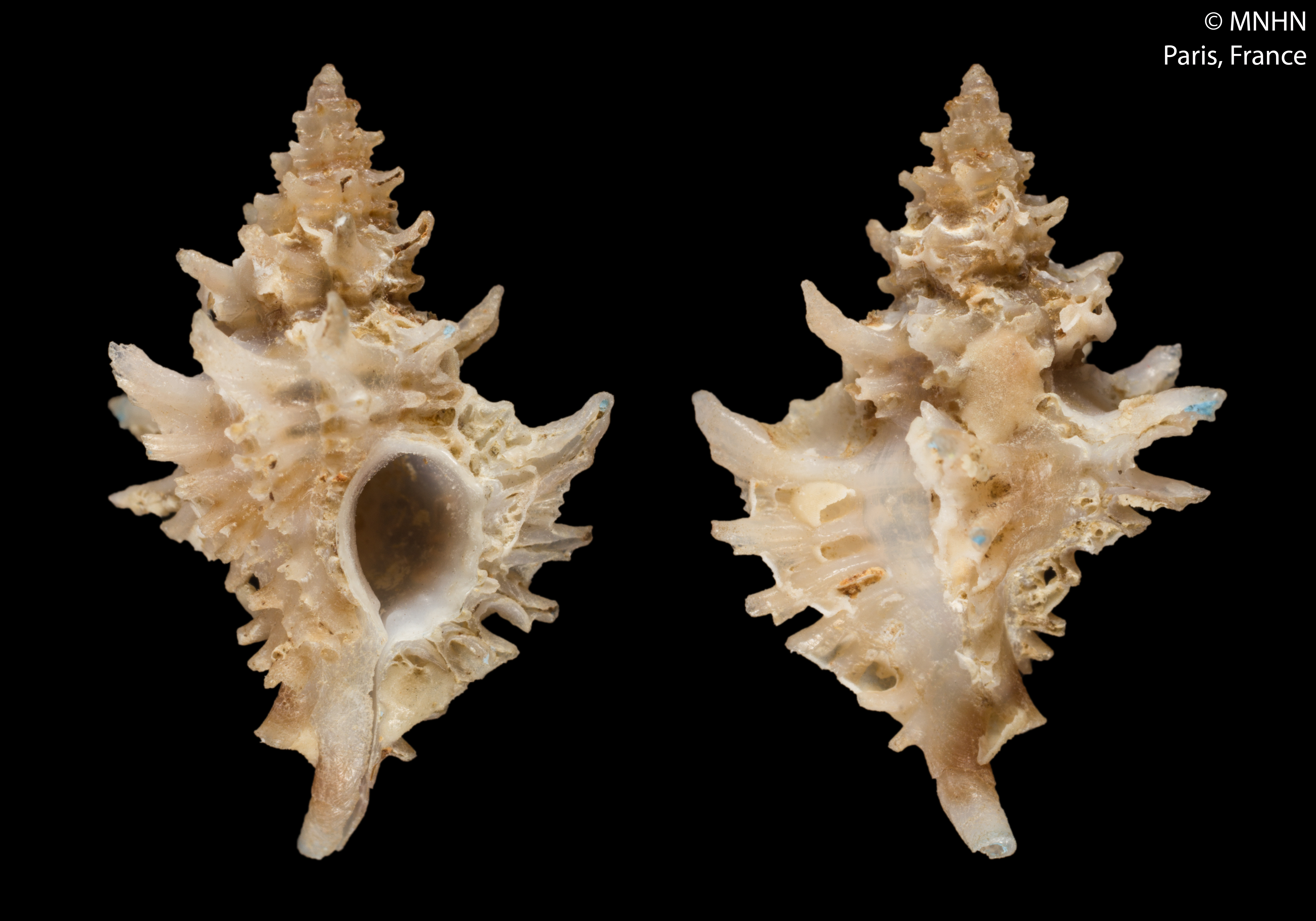
- A preserved shell of Favartia Parthi at the museum national d'Histoire naturelle

Scientific classification
- Kingdom: Animalia
- Phylum: Mollusca
- Class: Gastropoda
- Subclass: Caenogastropoda
- Order: Neogastropoda
- Family: Muricidae
- Genus: Favartia
- Species: F. parthi

Binomial name
- Favartia parthi Houart, 1993

Synonyms
- Favartia (Favartia) parthi Houart, 1993· accepted, alternate representation; Favartia (Murexiella) parthi Houart, 1993

= Favartia parthi =

Species of gastropod

Favartia parthi is a species of sea snail, a marine gastropod mollusk in the family Muricidae, the murex snails or rock snails.
