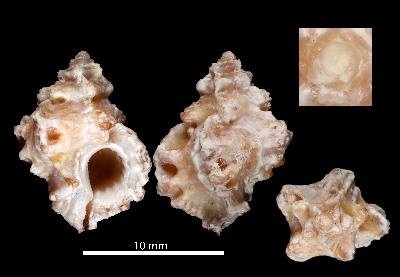
- Shell of Favartia coltrorum (paratype in MNHN, Paris)

Scientific classification
- Kingdom: Animalia
- Phylum: Mollusca
- Class: Gastropoda
- Subclass: Caenogastropoda
- Order: Neogastropoda
- Family: Muricidae
- Genus: Favartia
- Species: F. coltrorum

Binomial name
- Favartia coltrorum Houart, 2005

Synonyms
- Favartia (Favartia) coltrorum Houart, 2005· accepted, alternate representation

= Favartia coltrorum =

Species of gastropod

Favartia coltrorum is a species of sea snail, a marine gastropod mollusk in the family Muricidae, the murex snails or rock snails.

== Distribution ==
This marine species occurs off Bahia, Brazil.
