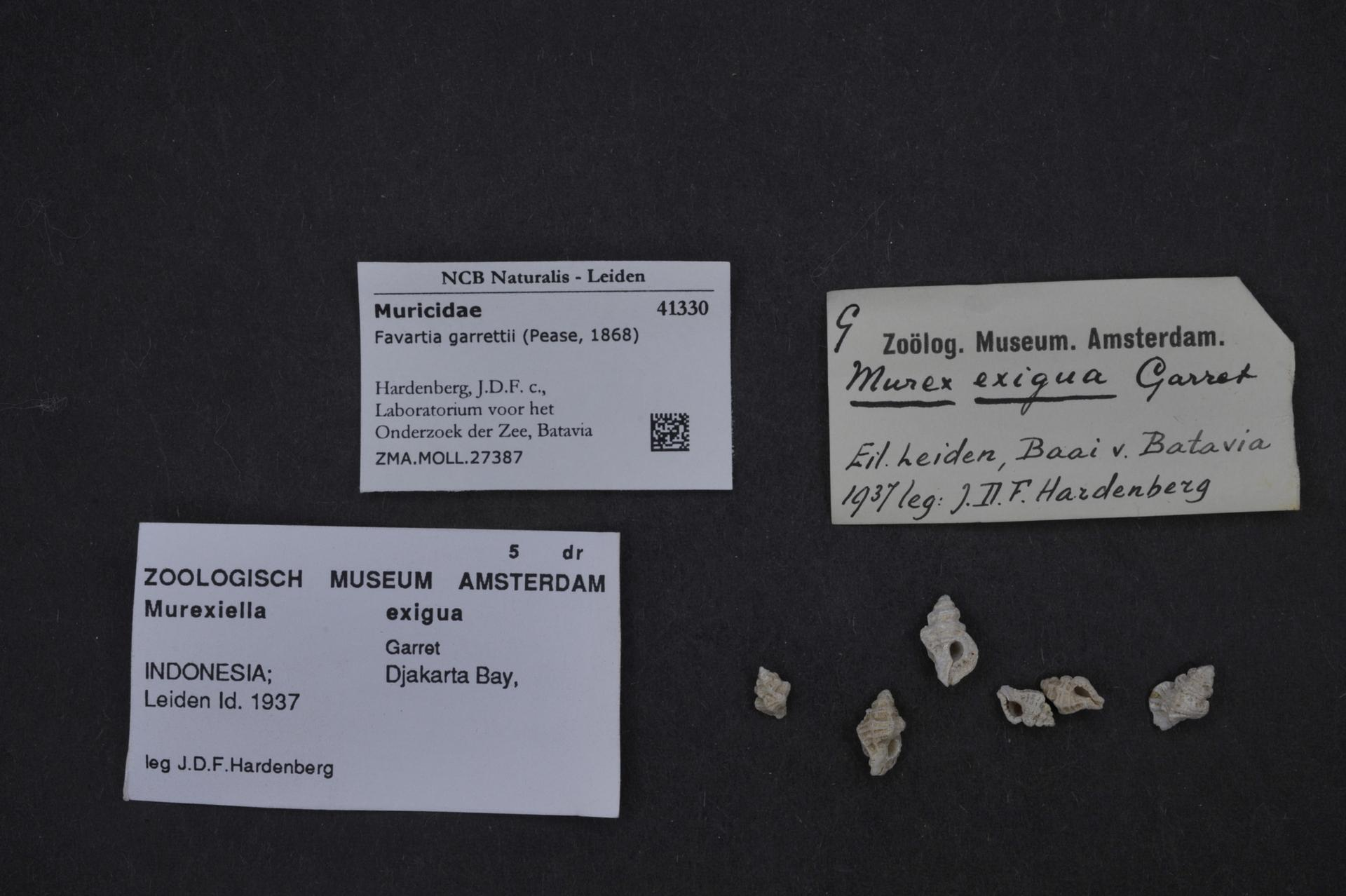

Scientific classification
- Kingdom: Animalia
- Phylum: Mollusca
- Class: Gastropoda
- Subclass: Caenogastropoda
- Order: Neogastropoda
- Family: Muricidae
- Genus: Favartia
- Species: F. garrettii

Binomial name
- Favartia garrettii (Pease, 1868)

Synonyms
- Favartia garretti (Pease, 1868); Murex cyclostoma var. baldwiniana Pilsbry, 1921; Murex exiguus Garrett, 1857; Murex garrettii Pease, 1868

= Favartia garrettii =

Species of gastropod

Favartia garrettii is a species of sea snail, a marine gastropod mollusk in the family Muricidae, the murex snails or rock snails.
