= Favartia peasei =

Scientific classification
- Kingdom: Animalia
- Phylum: Mollusca
- Class: Gastropoda
- Subclass: Caenogastropoda
- Order: Neogastropoda
- Family: Muricidae
- Genus: Favartia
- Species: F. peasei

Binomial name
- Favartia peasei (Tryon, 1880)

Synonyms
- Favartia brevispira Bozzetti, 2007; Hexaplex puniceus Oliver, 1915; Murex foveolatus Pease, 1869; Murex peasei Tryon, 1880

Species of gastropod

Favartia peasei is a species of sea snail, a marine gastropod mollusk in the family Muricidae, the murex snails or rock snails.
