= Favartia pacei =

Scientific classification
- Kingdom: Animalia
- Phylum: Mollusca
- Class: Gastropoda
- Subclass: Caenogastropoda
- Order: Neogastropoda
- Family: Muricidae
- Genus: Favartia
- Species: F. pacei

Binomial name
- Favartia pacei Petuch, 1988

Species of gastropod

Favartia pacei is a species of sea snail, a marine gastropod mollusk in the family Muricidae, the murex snails or rock snails.

== Description ==
Shell size 17mm.

== Distribution ==
Western Atlantic: Florida Keys, Florida.
