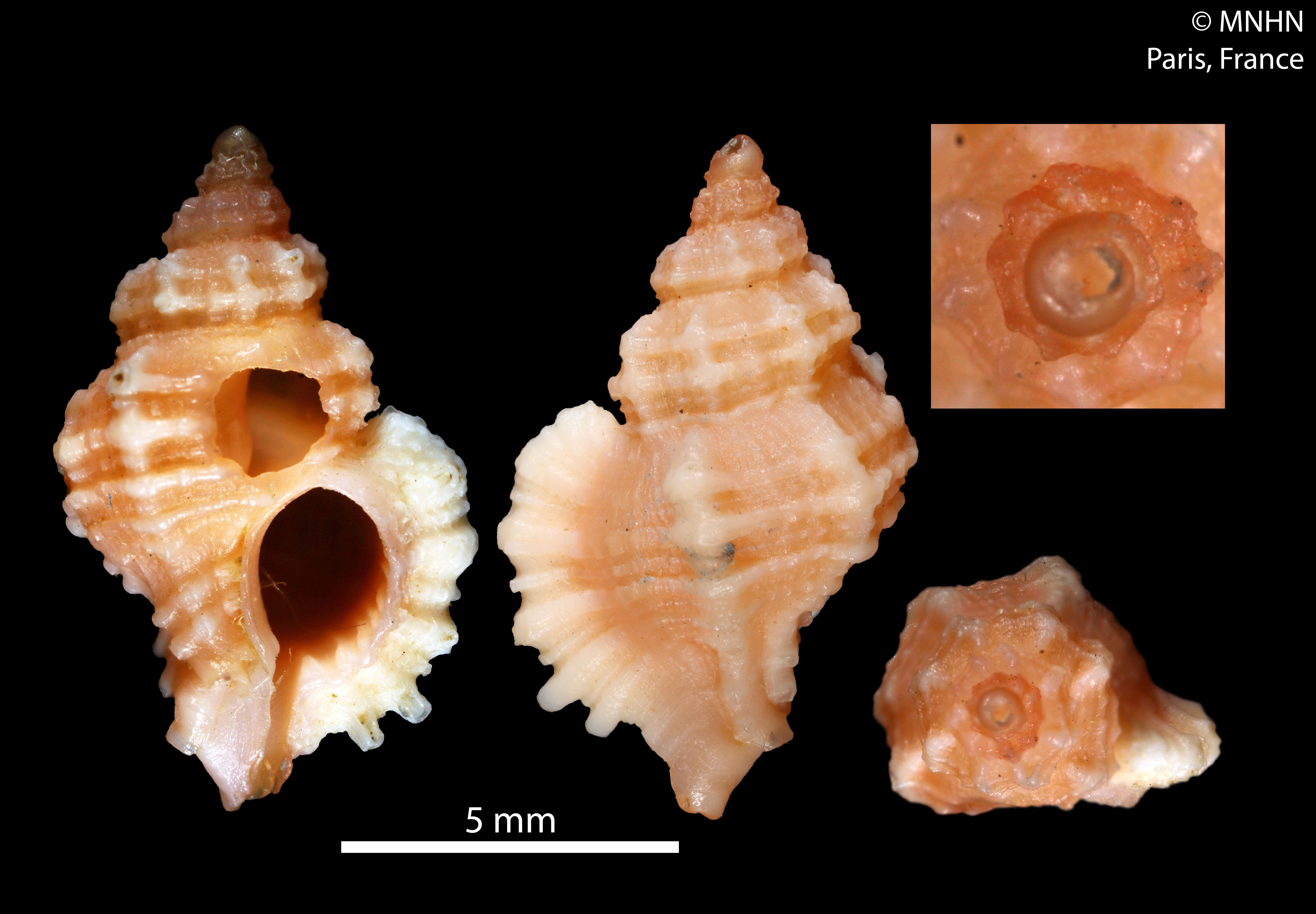
- Shell of Favartia cecalupoi (paratype at MNHN, Paris)

Scientific classification
- Kingdom: Animalia
- Phylum: Mollusca
- Class: Gastropoda
- Subclass: Caenogastropoda
- Order: Neogastropoda
- Family: Muricidae
- Genus: Favartia
- Species: F. cecalupoi

Binomial name
- Favartia cecalupoi Bozzetti, 1993

Synonyms
- Favartia (Favartia) cecalupoi Bozzetti, 1993· accepted, alternate representation

= Favartia cecalupoi =

Species of gastropod

Favartia cecalupoi is a species of sea snail, a marine gastropod mollusk in the family Muricidae, the murex snails or rock snails.

== Distribution ==
This marine species occurs in the Indian Ocean off Somalia.
