= Favartia emersoni =

Scientific classification
- Kingdom: Animalia
- Phylum: Mollusca
- Class: Gastropoda
- Subclass: Caenogastropoda
- Order: Neogastropoda
- Family: Muricidae
- Genus: Favartia
- Species: F. emersoni

Binomial name
- Favartia emersoni Radwin & D'Attilio, 1976

Synonyms
- Murex gravidus Hinds, 1844

Species of gastropod

Favartia emersoni is a species of sea snail, a marine gastropod mollusk in the family Muricidae, the murex snails or rock snails.
