= Favartia mactanensis =

Scientific classification
- Kingdom: Animalia
- Phylum: Mollusca
- Class: Gastropoda
- Subclass: Caenogastropoda
- Order: Neogastropoda
- Family: Muricidae
- Genus: Favartia
- Species: F. mactanensis

Binomial name
- Favartia mactanensis (Emerson & D'Attilio, 1979)

Synonyms
- Murexiella mactanensis Emerson & D'Attilio, 1979

Species of gastropod

Favartia mactanensis is a species of sea snail, a marine gastropod mollusk in the family Muricidae, the murex snails or rock snails.
