= Favartia lindae =

Scientific classification
- Kingdom: Animalia
- Phylum: Mollusca
- Class: Gastropoda
- Subclass: Caenogastropoda
- Order: Neogastropoda
- Family: Muricidae
- Genus: Favartia
- Species: F. lindae

Binomial name
- Favartia lindae Petuch, 1987

Species of gastropod

Favartia lindae is a species of sea snail, a marine gastropod mollusk in the family Muricidae, the murex snails or rock snails.

== Description ==
Original description: "Shell small for genus, thin, delicate, elongated, fusiform; 5 varices per whorl; 6 major cords around body whorl, with 1 minor cord in-between; cords frilly, fimbriated; varices coarsely ribbed, cancellated; siphonal canal with 2 large, fimbriated cords; siphonal cords end in 2 large spines on each varix on siphonal canal; aperture large in proportion to shell size; shell color pale tan with varices being darker tan-brown; spire elevated; protoconch and early whorls brown."

== Distribution ==
Locus typicus: "(Dredged from) 150 metres depth
50 kilometres South of Apalachicola, Florida, USA."
