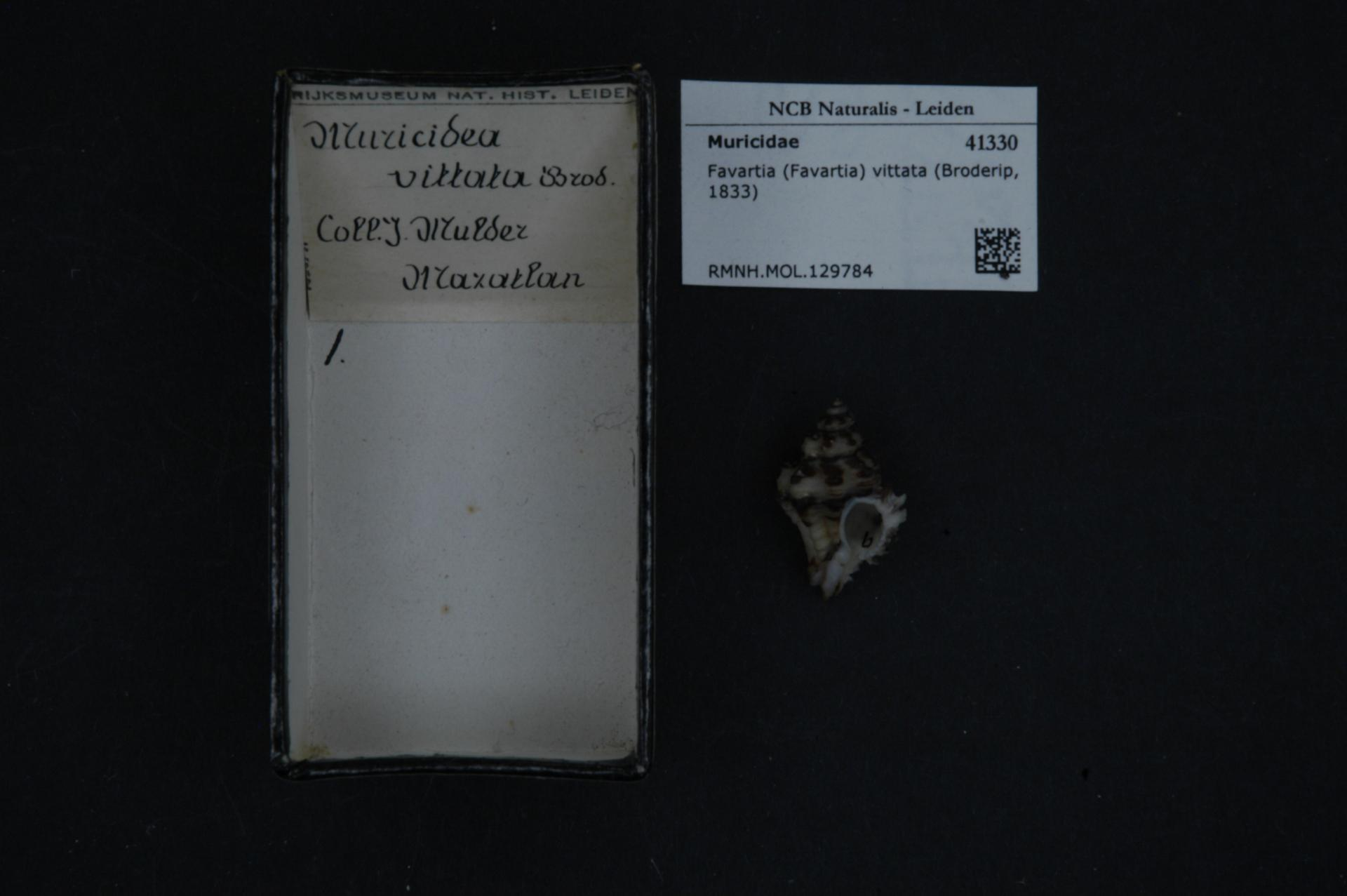

Scientific classification
- Kingdom: Animalia
- Phylum: Mollusca
- Class: Gastropoda
- Subclass: Caenogastropoda
- Order: Neogastropoda
- Family: Muricidae
- Genus: Favartia
- Species: F. vittata

Binomial name
- Favartia vittata (Broderip, 1833)

Synonyms
- Murex lepidus Reeve, 1845; Murex vittata Broderip, 1833; Murex vittatus Broderip, 1833; Murexiella (Murexiella) vittata (Broderip, W.J., 1833)

= Favartia vittata =

Species of gastropod

Favartia (Favartia) vittata is a species of sea snail, a marine gastropod mollusk in the family Muricidae, the murex snails or rock snails.

== Description ==
The shell size varies between 15 mm and 35 mm.

== Distribution ==
This species is distributed in the Gulf of California, (W Mexico) and in the Pacific Ocean along Peru and Galápagos.
