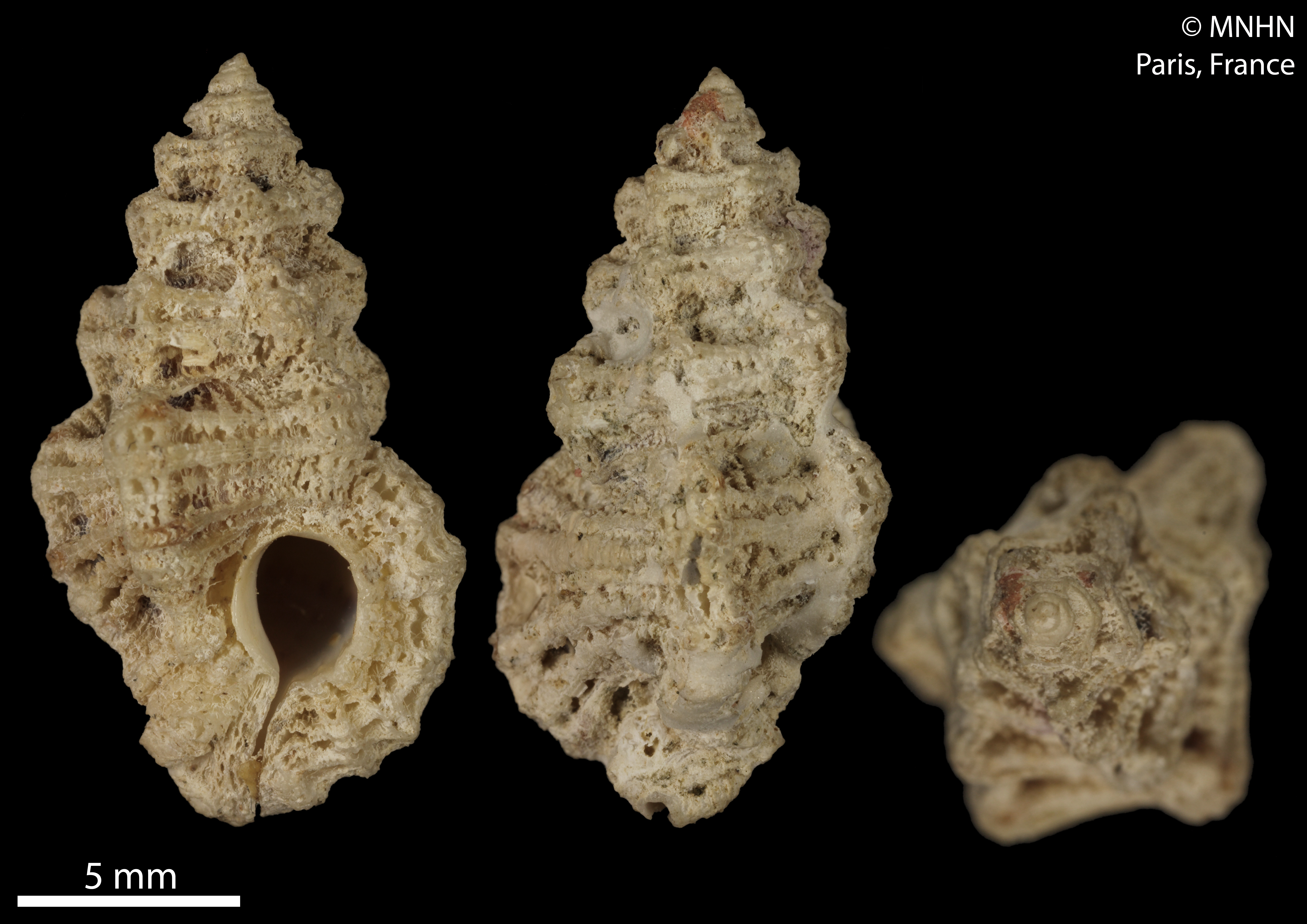
- Shell of Favartia alveata (specimen at MNHN, Paris)

Scientific classification
- Kingdom: Animalia
- Phylum: Mollusca
- Class: Gastropoda
- Subclass: Caenogastropoda
- Order: Neogastropoda
- Family: Muricidae
- Genus: Favartia
- Species: F. alveata

Binomial name
- Favartia alveata (Kiener, 1842)

Synonyms
- Aspella elegans sensu Perrilliat Montoya Vokes, 1971; Murex alveatus Kiener, 1842; Murex intermedius C. B. Adams, 1850

= Favartia alveata =

Species of gastropod

Favartia alveata is a species of sea snail, a marine gastropod mollusk in the family Muricidae, the murex snails or rock snails.

== Distribution ==
This species occurs in the Caribbean Sea off Guadeloupe.
