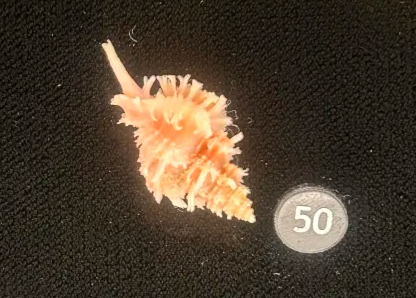
- Favartia judithae at the Houston Museum of Natural Science

Scientific classification
- Kingdom: Animalia
- Phylum: Mollusca
- Class: Gastropoda
- Subclass: Caenogastropoda
- Order: Neogastropoda
- Family: Muricidae
- Genus: Favartia
- Species: F. judithae

Binomial name
- Favartia judithae D'Attilio & Bartch, 1980

Synonyms
- Favartia judithae D'Attilio & Bertsch, 1980

= Favartia judithae =

Species of gastropod

Favartia judithae is a species of sea snail, a marine gastropod mollusk in the family Muricidae, the murex snails or rock snails.
