= Favartia taylorae =

Scientific classification
- Kingdom: Animalia
- Phylum: Mollusca
- Class: Gastropoda
- Subclass: Caenogastropoda
- Order: Neogastropoda
- Family: Muricidae
- Genus: Favartia
- Species: F. taylorae

Binomial name
- Favartia taylorae Petuch, 1987

Synonyms
- Murexiella taylorae Petuch, 1987

Species of gastropod

Favartia (Murexiella) taylorae taylorae is a species of sea snail, a marine gastropod mollusk in the family Muricidae, the murex snails or rock snails.

== Description ==
Original description: "Shell small for genus, with oval body, elevated spire and long siphonal canal; 7 varices per whorl; varices with 6 large, strongly recurved spines; intervarical areas with 6 large fimbriated cords; siphonal canal with 2 large recurved spines; last spines of siphonal canal greatly recurved, almost touching varical spines; shoulder sharply angled; spire whorls tabulate; shell color rosy-tan with dark rose spots in pits at the base of each varix; siphonal canal pinkish-rose; interior of aperture pinkish-rose."

The shell grows to a length of 16 mm

== Distribution ==
Locus typicus: "(Trawled from) 200 metres depth off Cedar Key, Florida, USA."

This species is distributed in the Gulf of Mexico along Florida.
