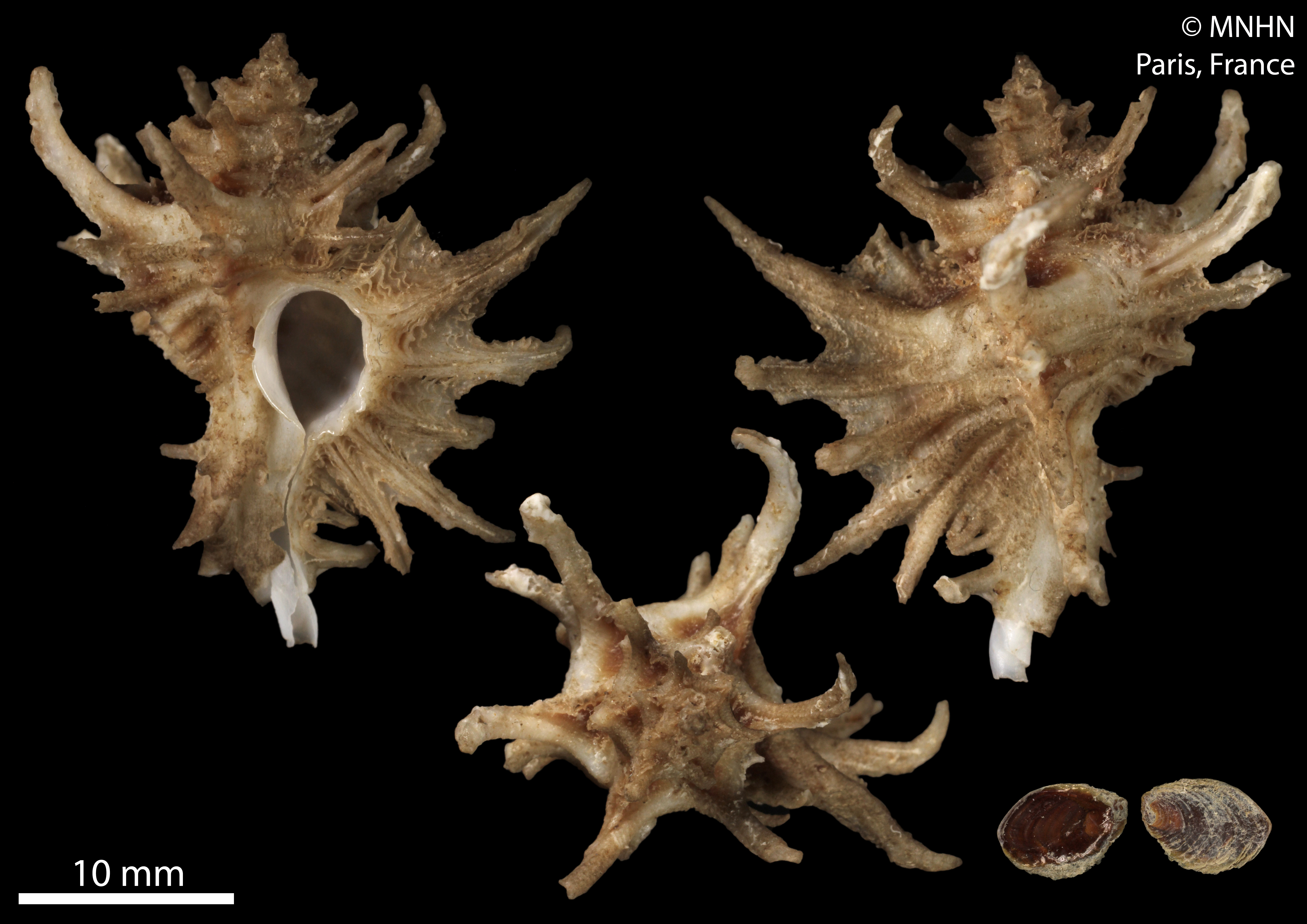
- Shell of Favartia hidalgoi (specimen at MNHN, Paris)

Scientific classification
- Kingdom: Animalia
- Phylum: Mollusca
- Class: Gastropoda
- Subclass: Caenogastropoda
- Order: Neogastropoda
- Family: Muricidae
- Genus: Favartia
- Species: F. hidalgoi

Binomial name
- Favartia hidalgoi (Crosse, 1869)

Synonyms
- Favartia (Murexiella) hidalgoi (Crosse, 1869)· accepted, alternate representation; Murex hidalgoi Crosse, 1869; Murexiella hidalgoi (Crosse, 1869)

= Favartia hidalgoi =

Species of gastropod

Favartia hidalgoi, common namer : the Hidalgo's Murex, is a species of sea snail, a marine gastropod mollusk in the family Muricidae, the murex snails or rock snails.

== Description ==
The shell size varies between 22 mm and 38 mm.

== Distribution ==
This species occurs in the deeper waters of the Gulf of Mexico and in the Atlantic Ocean from North Carolina to Southern Brazil, including the Antilles and Barbados.
