= Favartia striasquamosa =

Scientific classification
- Kingdom: Animalia
- Phylum: Mollusca
- Class: Gastropoda
- Subclass: Caenogastropoda
- Order: Neogastropoda
- Family: Muricidae
- Genus: Favartia
- Species: F. striasquamosa

Binomial name
- Favartia striasquamosa Ponder, 1972

Synonyms
- Favartia (Murexiella) striasquamosa Ponder, 1972

Species of gastropod

Favartia striasquamosa is a species of sea snail, a marine gastropod mollusk in the family Muricidae, the murex snails or rock snails.
