= Favartia cyclostoma =

Scientific classification
- Kingdom: Animalia
- Phylum: Mollusca
- Class: Gastropoda
- Subclass: Caenogastropoda
- Order: Neogastropoda
- Family: Muricidae
- Genus: Favartia
- Species: F. cyclostoma

Binomial name
- Favartia cyclostoma (Sowerby II, 1841)

Synonyms
- Murex cyclostoma Sowerby, 1841; Murex foraminiferus Tapparone Canefri in Kobelt, 1877; Murex nucula Reeve, 1845

Species of gastropod

Favartia cyclostoma is a species of sea snail, a marine gastropod mollusk in the family Muricidae, the murex snails or rock snails.
