= Favartia diomedaea =

Scientific classification
- Kingdom: Animalia
- Phylum: Mollusca
- Class: Gastropoda
- Subclass: Caenogastropoda
- Order: Neogastropoda
- Family: Muricidae
- Genus: Favartia
- Species: F. diomedaea

Binomial name
- Favartia diomedaea (Dall, 1908)

Synonyms
- Murex diomedaea Dall, 1908

Species of gastropod

Favartia diomedaea is a species of sea snail, a marine gastropod mollusk in the family Muricidae, the murex snails or rock snails.
