= Favartia perita =

Scientific classification
- Kingdom: Animalia
- Phylum: Mollusca
- Class: Gastropoda
- Subclass: Caenogastropoda
- Order: Neogastropoda
- Family: Muricidae
- Genus: Favartia
- Species: F. perita

Binomial name
- Favartia perita (Hinds, 1844)

Synonyms
- Murex peritus Hinds, 1844; Murexiella (Murexiella) perita (Hinds, R.B., 1844)

Species of gastropod

Favartia (Favartia) perita is a species of sea snail, a marine gastropod mollusk in the family Muricidae, the murex snails or rock snails.

== Description ==
The size of the shell is 21 mm

== Distribution ==
This species is distributed in the Pacific Ocean along Baja California, Panama and the Galapagos islands.
