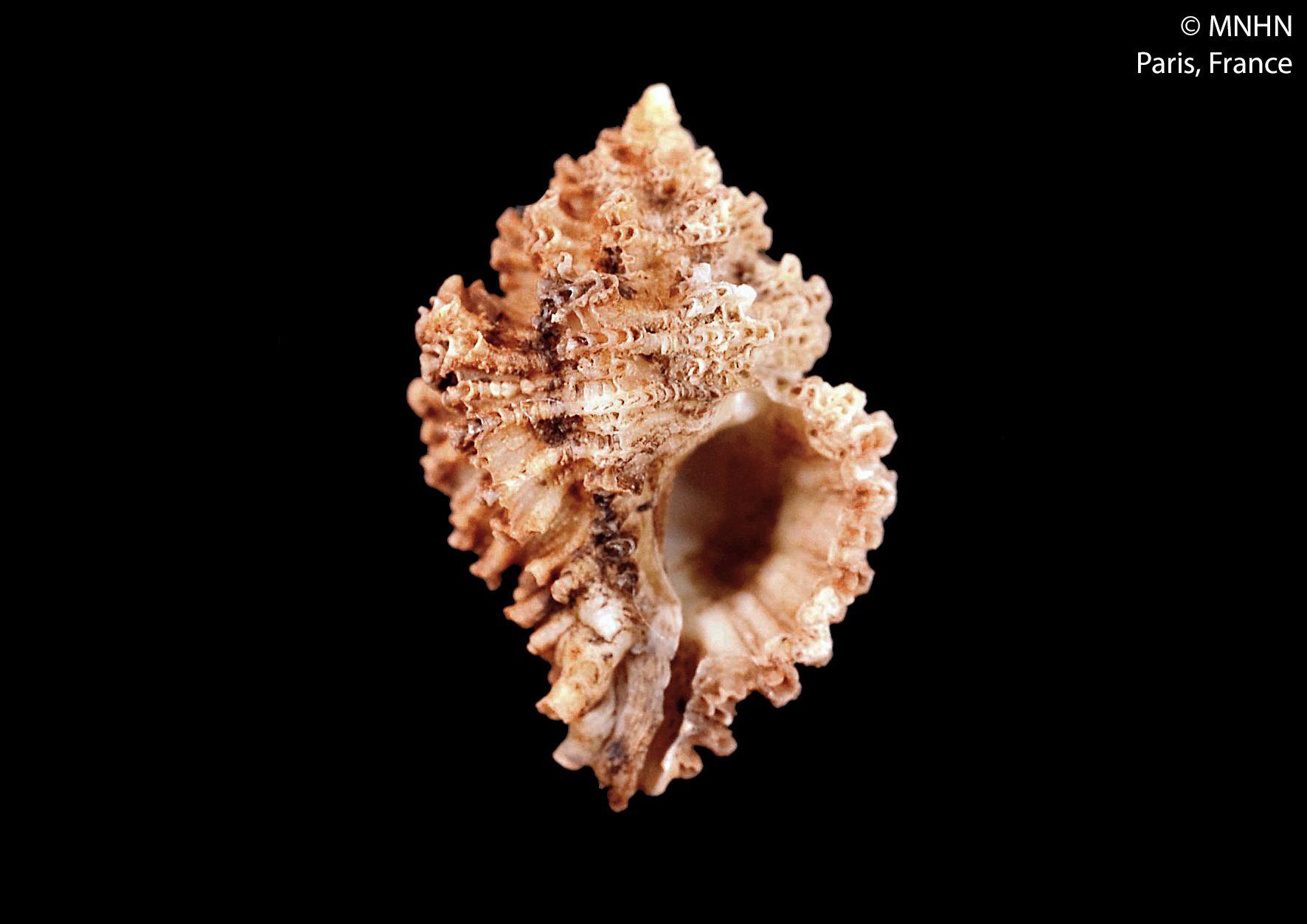
- Shell of Favartia nuceus (specimen at MNHN, Paris)

Scientific classification
- Kingdom: Animalia
- Phylum: Mollusca
- Class: Gastropoda
- Subclass: Caenogastropoda
- Order: Neogastropoda
- Family: Muricidae
- Genus: Favartia
- Species: F. nuceus

Binomial name
- Favartia nuceus (Mörch, 1850)

Synonyms
- Favartia (Favartia) nuceus (Mörch, 1850)· accepted, alternate representation; Favartia nucea (Mörch, 1850) ( is a substantive in apposition and does not agree in gender with the genus name); Murex nuceus Mörch, 1850

= Favartia nuceus =

Species of gastropod

Favartia nuceus is a species of sea snail, a marine gastropod mollusk in the family Muricidae, the murex snails or rock snails.

== Distribution ==
This marine species occurs off French Guiana.
