= Favartia glypta =

Scientific classification
- Kingdom: Animalia
- Phylum: Mollusca
- Class: Gastropoda
- Subclass: Caenogastropoda
- Order: Neogastropoda
- Family: Muricidae
- Genus: Favartia
- Species: F. glypta

Binomial name
- Favartia glypta (M. Smith, 1938)

Synonyms
- Murex glyptus M. Smith, 1938; Murexiella glypta (M. Smith, 1938); Murexiella iemanja Petuch, 1979

Species of gastropod

Favartia (Favartia) glypta is a species of sea snail, a marine gastropod mollusk in the family Muricidae, the murex snails or rock snails.

== Description ==
The shell size varies between 12 mm and 29 mm.

== Distribution ==
This species is distributed in the Gulf of Mexico along Florida and in the Atlantic Ocean along Brazil.
