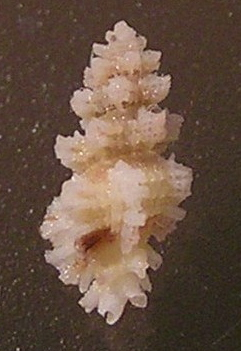
- shell of Favartia guamensis

Scientific classification
- Kingdom: Animalia
- Phylum: Mollusca
- Class: Gastropoda
- Subclass: Caenogastropoda
- Order: Neogastropoda
- Superfamily: Muricoidea
- Family: Muricidae
- Subfamily: Aspellinae
- Genus: Favartia; Jousseaume, 1880

Type species
- Murex breviculus G. B. Sowerby II, 1834

Synonyms
- List: Aspella (Caribiella) Perrilliat, 1972; Aspella (Favartia) Jousseaume, 1880; Favartia (Caribiella) Perilliat, 1972; Favartia (Favartia) Jousseaume, 1880; Favartia (Murexiella) Clench & Pérez Farfante, 1945; Minnimurex Woolacott, 1957; Murex (Favartia) Jousseaume, 1880; Murex (Murexiella) Clench & Pérez Farfante, 1945; Murexiella Clench & Pérez Farfante, 1945; †Murexiella (Murexiella) Clench & Pérez Farfante, 1945; Ocenebra (Favartia) Jousseaume, 1880; Ocinebra (Favartia) Jousseaume, 1880

= Favartia =

Genus of gastropods

Favartia is a genus of sea snails, marine gastropod mollusks in the family Muricidae, the murex snails or rock snails. It is known for its crystalline shell.

== Species ==
The following species are recognised in the genus Favartia:

- Favartia absona (De Cristofori & Jan, 1832) †
- Favartia alveata (Kiener, 1842)
- Favartia andamanensis (Houart & Surya Rao, 1996)
- Favartia aporema Houart, 2016
- Favartia aquinoi Houart, 2019
- Favartia balteata (G. B. Sowerby II, 1841)
- Favartia barbarae E. H. Vokes, 1994
- Favartia bojadorensis (Locard, 1897)
- Favartia bractea Houart, 2016
- Favartia brazieri (Angas, 1877)
- Favartia brevicula (G. B. Sowerby II, 1834)
- Favartia brevispira Bozzetti, 2007
- Favartia burnayi Houart, 1981
- Favartia caitlinae (Petuch & R. F. Myers, 2014)
- Favartia carmenae E. H. Vokes, 1994 †
- Favartia cecalupoi Bozzetti, 1993
- Favartia cellulosa (Conrad, 1846)
- Favartia charlesi Garrigues & D. Lamy, 2016
- Favartia cirrosa (Hinds, 1844)
- Favartia cocosensis B. W. Myers & D'Attilio, 1990
- Favartia colombi Houart & Gori, 2011
- Favartia coltrorum Houart, 2005
- Favartia concava Garrigues & D. Lamy, 2019
- Favartia concavoptera (Kosuge, 1980)
- Favartia confusa (Brazier, 1877)
- Favartia conleyi Houart, 1999
- Favartia crouchi (G. B. Sowerby III, 1894)
- Favartia cyclostoma (G. B. Sowerby II, 1841)
- Favartia czjzeki (R. Hoernes & Auinger, 1885) †
- Favartia dalli (Espinosa & Ortea, 2011)
- Favartia deynzeri Houart, 1998
- Favartia deynzerorum (Petuch, 2013)
- Favartia diomedaea (Dall, 1908)
- Favartia dipsacus (Broderip, 1833)
- Favartia eastorum Houart, 1998
- Favartia edwardpauli (Petuch, 1990)
- Favartia emersoni Radwin & D'Attilio, 1976
- Favartia erosa (Broderip, 1833)
- Favartia excisa (Grateloup, 1833) †
- Favartia exigua (Broderip, 1833)
- Favartia faceta (E. H. Vokes, 1963) †
- Favartia flexirostris (Melvill, 1898)
- Favartia fournierae Houart & Héros, 2013
- Favartia garrettii (Pease, 1868)
- Favartia glypta (M. Smith, 1938)
- Favartia goldbergi Petuch & Sargent, 2011
- Favartia graceae (T. L. McGinty, 1940) †
- Favartia guamensis W. K. Emerson & D'Attilio, 1979
- Favartia hidalgoi (Crosse, 1869)
- Favartia hilli (Petuch, 1987)
- Favartia humilis (Broderip, 1833)
- Favartia iemanja (Petuch, 1979)
- Favartia incisa (Broderip, 1833)
- Favartia iredalei Ponder, 1972
- Favartia jacquesi (Espinosa & Ortea, 2016)
- Favartia jeanae Bertsch & D'Attilio, 1980
- Favartia judithae D'Attilio & Bertsch, 1980
- Favartia kalafuti (Petuch, 1987)
- Favartia kanneri Houart, 2021
- Favartia keenae (E. H. Vokes, 1970)
- Favartia kostejana (O. Boettger, 1902) †
- Favartia laletania Goret, Ledon & Pons, 2013 †
- Favartia lappa (Broderip, 1833)
- Favartia laurae (E. H. Vokes, 1970)
- Favartia leonae D'Attilio & B. W. Myers, 1985
- Favartia leonardhilli (Petuch, 1987)
- Favartia levicula (Dall, 1889)
- Favartia lindae Petuch, 1987
- Favartia macgintyi (M. Smith, 1938)
- Favartia mactanensis (W. K. Emerson & D'Attilio, 1979)
- Favartia maculata (Reeve, 1845)
- Favartia madangensis Houart, 2020
- Favartia marjoriae (Melvill & Standen, 1903)
- Favartia martini (Shikama, 1977)
- Favartia massemini Merle & Garrigues, 2008
- Favartia micromeris (Dall, 1890) †
- Favartia mikrostenos Houart, Gori & Rosado, 2017
- Favartia milleti Ceulemans, van Dingenen, Merle & Landau, 2016 †
- Favartia minatauros Radwin & D'Attilio, 1976
- Favartia minirosea (R. T. Abbott, 1954)
- Favartia minuscula (M. Smith, 1947)
- Favartia minuta Garrigues & D. Lamy, 2019
- Favartia morisakii Kuroda & Habe, 1961
- Favartia natalensis (E. A. Smith, 1906)
- Favartia nivea Houart & Tröndlé, 2008
- Favartia norrisii (Reeve, 1845)
- Favartia nuceus (Mörch, 1850)
- Favartia oscari Espinosa, Ortea & Moro, 2019
- Favartia pacei Petuch, 1988
- Favartia palmeiraensis Espinosa, Ortea & Moro, 2019
- Favartia parthi Houart, 1993
- Favartia parvula (E. H. Vokes, 1994) †
- Favartia paulmieri Houart, 2002
- Favartia peasei (Tryon, 1880)
- Favartia pelepili D'Attilio & Bertsch, 1980
- Favartia peregrina (B. M. Olivera, 1980)
- Favartia perita (Hinds, 1844)
- Favartia petiti (E. H. Vokes, 1968) †
- Favartia petuchi (E. H. Vokes, 1994) †
- Favartia peyroti (Montanaro, 1935) †
- Favartia phantom (Woolacott, 1957)
- Favartia plioelata Brunetti & Della Bella, 2022 †
- Favartia ponderi B. W. Myers & D'Attilio, 1989
- Favartia pseudosalmonea Houart, 2016
- Favartia puntagordana (Weisbord, 1962)
- Favartia purdyae E. H. Vokes & D'Attilio, 1980
- Favartia radwini (W. K. Emerson & D'Attilio, 1970)
- Favartia rosamiae D'Attilio & B. W. Myers, 1985
- Favartia rosea Habe, 1961
- Favartia roseotincta Houart & Gori, 2011
- Favartia salmonea (Melvill & Standen, 1899)
- Favartia salvati Houart & Tröndlé, 2008
- Favartia shaskyi D'Attilio & B. W. Myers, 1988
- Favartia shilohensis (Heilprin, 1888) †
- Favartia stephensae (E. H. Vokes, 1994) †
- Favartia striasquamosa Ponder, 1972
- Favartia suboblonga (d'Orbigny, 1852) †
- Favartia sykesi (Preston, 1904)
- Favartia tantelyi Houart & Héros, 2013
- Favartia taylorae (Petuch, 1987)
- Favartia tetragona (Broderip, 1833)
- Favartia varimutabilis Houart, 1991
- Favartia vaughani MacNeil, 1984 †
- Favartia veracruzana (E. H. Vokes, 1968) †
- Favartia vittata (Broderip, 1833)
- Favartia voorwindei Ponder, 1972
- Favartia vulcana Espinosa, Ortea & Moro, 2019
- Favartia xuani Thach, 2016
- Favartia zalaya E. H. Vokes, 1989 †
