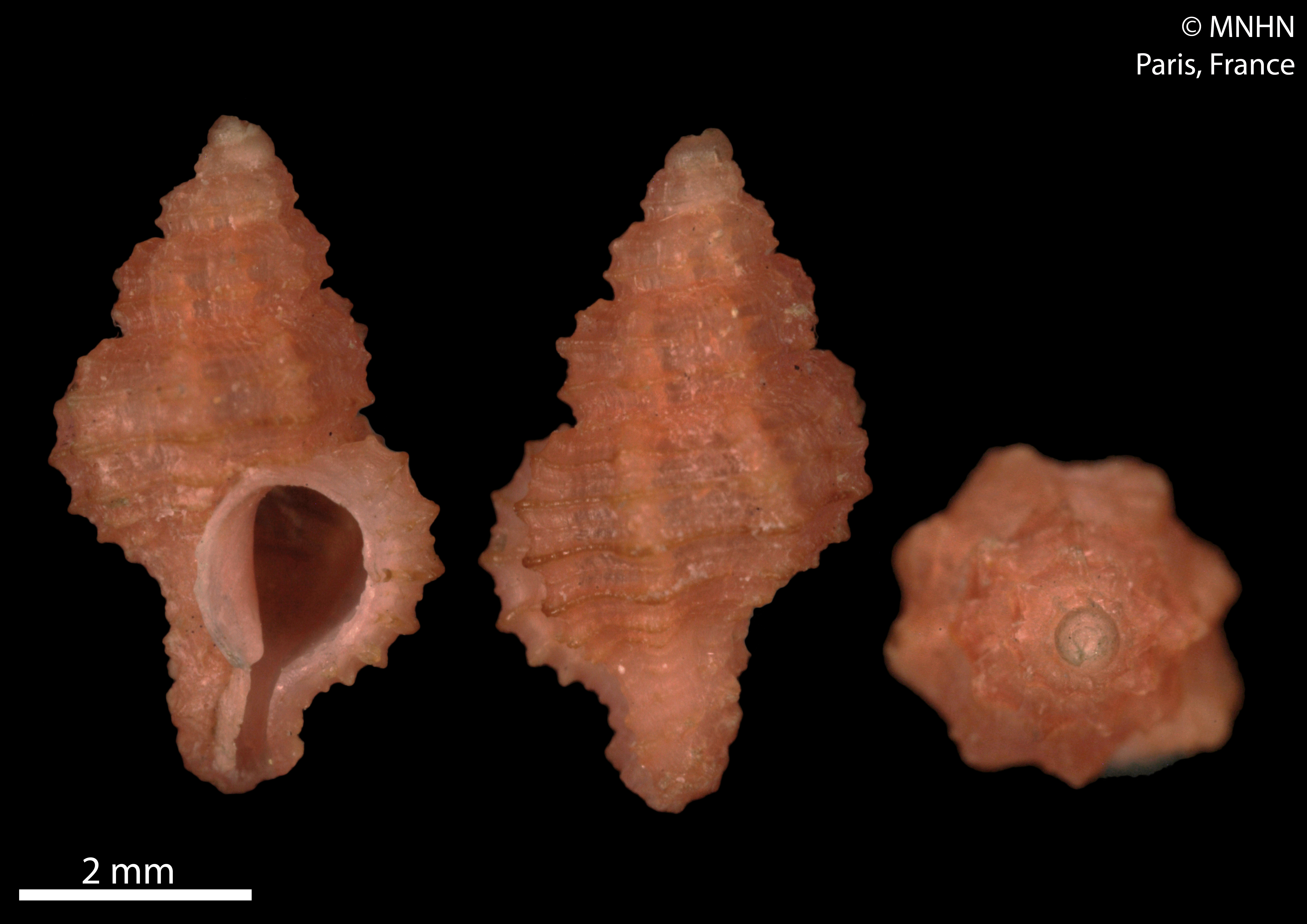
- Shell of Favartia minirosea (specimen at MNHN, Paris)

Scientific classification
- Kingdom: Animalia
- Phylum: Mollusca
- Class: Gastropoda
- Subclass: Caenogastropoda
- Order: Neogastropoda
- Family: Muricidae
- Genus: Favartia
- Species: F. minirosea

Binomial name
- Favartia minirosea (Abbott, 1954)

Synonyms
- Favartia (Favartia) minirosea (Abbott, 1954)· accepted, alternate representation; Murex coccineus A. Adams, 1854; Ocenebra (Ocinebrina) minirosea Abbott, 1954

= Favartia minirosea =

Species of gastropod

Favartia minirosea is a species of sea snail, a marine gastropod mollusk in the family Muricidae, the murex snails or rock snails.

== Distribution ==
This species occurs in the Caribbean Sea off Jamaica and Guadeloupe.
