= Favartia levicula =

Scientific classification
- Kingdom: Animalia
- Phylum: Mollusca
- Class: Gastropoda
- Subclass: Caenogastropoda
- Order: Neogastropoda
- Family: Muricidae
- Genus: Favartia
- Species: F. levicula

Binomial name
- Favartia levicula (Dall, 1889)

Synonyms
- Murexiella levicula (Dall, 1889); Ocinebra Favartia levicula Dall, 1889

Species of gastropod

Favartia (Favartia) levicula is a species of sea snail, a marine gastropod mollusc in the family Muricidae, the murex snails or rock snails.

== Description ==
The shell grows to a length of 18 mm.

== Distribution ==
This species is distributed in the Gulf of Mexico, the Caribbean Sea and in the Atlantic Ocean from North Carolina to Florida.
