= Favartia exigua =

Scientific classification
- Kingdom: Animalia
- Phylum: Mollusca
- Class: Gastropoda
- Subclass: Caenogastropoda
- Order: Neogastropoda
- Family: Muricidae
- Genus: Favartia
- Species: F. exigua

Binomial name
- Favartia exigua (Broderip, 1833)

Synonyms
- Murex exiguus Broderip, 1833; Murexiella venustula Poorman, 1983

Species of gastropod

Favartia exigua is a species of sea snail, a marine gastropod mollusk in the family Muricidae, the murex snails or rock snails.
