= Favartia maculata =

Scientific classification
- Kingdom: Animalia
- Phylum: Mollusca
- Class: Gastropoda
- Subclass: Caenogastropoda
- Order: Neogastropoda
- Family: Muricidae
- Genus: Favartia
- Species: F. maculata

Binomial name
- Favartia maculata (Reeve, 1845)

Synonyms
- Favartia dorothyae Emerson & D'Attilio, 1979; Murex (Ocinebra) salmonea Melvill & Standen, 1899; Murex maculatus Reeve, 1845b Murex marjoriae Melvill & Standen, 1903

Species of gastropod

Favartia maculata is a species of sea snail, a marine gastropod mollusc in the family Muricidae, the murex snails or rock snails.
