= 2008 Copa Perú =

Copa Perú
- Season: 2008
- Champions: Sport Huancayo

The 2008 Copa Perú season (Spanish: Copa Perú 2008), the promotion tournament of Peruvian football, started on February 1.

The tournament has 5 stages. The first four stages are played as mini-league round-robin tournaments, except for third stage in region IV, which is played as a knockout stage. The final stage features two knockout rounds and a final four-team group stage to determine the two promoted teams.

The 2008 Peru Cup started with the District Stage (Spanish: Etapa Distrital) on February 1. The next stage was the Provincial Stage (Spanish: Etapa Provincial) which started, on June 1. The tournament continued with the Departamental Stage (Spanish: Etapa Departamental) on July 16. The Regional Staged followed. The National Stage (Spanish: Etapa Nacional) started on November 8. The winner and runner-up of the National Stage will be promoted to the First Division.

== Departmental Stage ==
The following list shows the teams that qualified for the Regional Stage.

Department	Team	Location
Amazonas	Agricobank San Lorenzo	Bagua
Amazonas	Higos Urco	Chachapoyas
Ancash	Tayca Chilcal	Huarmey
Ancash	Amenaza Verde	Huaraz
Apurímac	Sport Municipal	San Jerónimo
Apurímac	Deportivo Educación	Abancay
Arequipa	IDUNSA	Arequipa
Arequipa	Defensor Piérola	Camaná
Ayacucho	Sport Huamanga	Huamanga
Ayacucho	Deportivo Municipal (Huamanga)	Huamanga
Callao	Atlético Chalaco	Callao
Callao	Atlético Pilsen Callao	Callao
Callao	Deportivo SIMA	Callao
Cajamarca	Comerciantes Unidos	Cajamarca
Cajamarca	San Cayetano	Celendín
Cusco	Deportivo Garcilaso	Cusco
Cusco	Santa Rosa (Quillabamba)	La Convención
Huancavelica	Deportivo Municipal (Acobamba)	Acobamba
Huancavelica	Deportivo Municipal (Acoria)	Acoria
Huánuco	Alianza Universidad	Huánuco
Huánuco	León de Huánuco	Huánuco
Ica	UNICA	Ica
Ica	Juventud Guadalupe	Vista Alegre
Junín	Wanka	Huancayo
Junín	Sport Huancayo	Huancayo
La Libertad	Carlos A. Mannucci	Trujillo
La Libertad	Defensor Porvenir	El Porvenir

Department	Team	Location
Lambayeque	Deportivo Pomalca	Chiclayo
Lambayeque	Universidad Señor de Sipán	Chiclayo
Lima	Íntimo Cable Visión	Ate - Vitarte
Lima	Unión Huaral	Huaral
Lima	Unión Supe	Supe
Lima	Cooperativa Bolognesi	Barranco
Lima	Óscar Benavides	Ate - Vitarte
Loreto	CNI	Iquitos
Loreto	ADO	Iquitos
Madre de Dios	Juventud La Joya	Tambopata
Madre de Dios	MINSA	Tambopata
Moquegua	Cobresol	Moquegua
Moquegua	Atlético Huracán	Moquegua
Pasco	Deportivo Municipal (Yanahuanca)	Yanahuanca
Pasco	Unión Minas	Cerro de Pasco
Piura	Atlético Torino	Talara
Piura	Olimpia	La Unión
Puno	Policial Santa Rosa	Puno
Puno	Diablos Rojos	Juliaca
Puno	Alfonso Ugarte	Juliaca
San Martín	Santa Rosa (Morales)	Tarapoto
San Martín	Huallaga	Saposoa
Tacna	Dínamo de Solabaya	Ilabaya
Tacna	Deportivo Municipal (Locumba)	Locumba
Tumbes	Renovación Pacifico	Tumbes
Tumbes	Sport Buenos Aires	Tumbes
Ucayali	Tecnológico	Pucallpa
Ucayali	Santa Rosa (Pucallpa)	Pucallpa

== Regional Stage ==
Each region had two teams qualify for the next stage. The playoffs only determined the respective regional winners.

=== Region I ===
Region I includes qualified teams from Amazonas, Lambayeque, Tumbes and Piura region.

==== Group A ====
Pos	Team	Pld	W	D	L	GF	GA	GD	Pts	Qualification	TOR	POM	SBA	HUC
1	Atlético Torino	5	4	0	1	21	2	+19	12	National stage		2–0	5–0	11–0
2	Deportivo Pomalca	5	3	0	2	12	8	+4	9		0–2		3–1	5–1
3	Sport Buenos Aires	5	2	1	2	10	11	−1	7		2–1	W.O.		5–0
4	Higos Urco	5	0	1	4	5	27	−22	1		W.O.	2–4	2–2	

Legend: Blue = home team win; Yellow = draw; Red = away team win.

==== Group B ====
Pos	Team	Pld	W	D	L	GF	GA	GD	Pts	Qualification	RPA	OLU	USS	ASL
1	Renovación Pacífico	6	4	2	0	14	7	+7	14	National stage		2–1	2–2	4–1
2	Olimpia	6	3	1	2	16	6	+10	10		0–1		1–0	10–1
3	Universidad Señor de Sipán	6	2	3	1	15	8	+7	9		2–2	1–1		8–2
4	Agricobank San Lorenzo	6	0	0	6	6	30	−24	0		1–3	1–3	0–2	

Legend: Blue = home team win; Yellow = draw; Red = away team win.

==== Regional Final ====
Team 1	Agg.	Team 2	1st leg	2nd leg
Atlético Torino	2–1	Renovación Pacífico	0–1	2–0

=== Region II ===
Region II includes qualified teams from Ancash, Cajamarca, La Libertad and San Martín region.

==== Group A ====
Pos	Team	Pld	W	D	L	GF	GA	GD	Pts	Qualification	DPO	ANC	SRM	SCC
1	Defensor Porvenir	6	4	1	1	12	6	+6	13	National stage		2–0	2–1	4–0
2	Amenaza Verde	6	3	1	2	10	10	0	10		1–1		4–2	2–0
3	Santa Rosa (Morales)	6	3	0	3	21	10	+11	9		4–1	4–1		10–0
4	San Cayetano	6	1	0	5	3	20	−17	3		0–2	1–2	2–0	

Legend: Blue = home team win; Yellow = draw; Red = away team win.

==== Group B ====
Pos	Team	Pld	W	D	L	GF	GA	GD	Pts	Qualification	COM	HUA	CAM	TCH
1	Comerciantes Unidos	6	4	2	0	9	2	+7	14	National stage		1–1	4–1	2–0
2	Huallaga	6	3	1	2	10	4	+6	10		0–1		3–1	4–0
3	Carlos A. Mannucci	5	2	1	2	4	7	−3	7		0–0	1–0		W.O.
4	Tayca Chical	5	0	0	5	0	10	−10	0		0–1	0–2	0–1	

Updated to match(es) played on 2008. Source:
Legend: Blue = home team win; Yellow = draw; Red = away team win.
Rules for classification: 1) points; 2) goal difference; 3) number of goals scored.

=== Region III ===
Region III includes qualified teams from Loreto and Ucayali region.

Pos	Team	Pld	W	D	L	GF	GA	GD	Pts	Qualification	CNI	TEC	SRP	ADO
1	CNI	6	4	1	1	14	7	+7	13	National stage		2–2	3–0	3–0
2	Tecnológico	6	2	3	1	8	7	+1	9	National stage	2–1		1–0	1–1
3	Santa Rosa (Pucallpa)	6	2	0	4	6	10	−4	6		2–3	1–0		1–0
4	ADO	6	1	2	3	7	11	−4	5		1–2	2–2	3–2	

Legend: Blue = home team win; Yellow = draw; Red = away team win.

=== Region IV ===
Region IV includes qualified teams from Lima and Callao region. This region played as a knockout cup system and the finalists qualified.

==== First Stage ====
Team 1	Agg.	Team 2	1st leg	2nd leg
Óscar Benavides	0–2	Atlético Chalaco	0–0	0–2
Atlético Pilsen Callao	1–7	Unión Supe	1–2	0–5
Cooperativa Bolognesi	0–0 (3–4 p)	Unión Huaral	0–0	0–0
Deportivo SIMA	0–5	Íntimo Cable Visión	0–1	0–4

==== Semifinals ====
Team 1	Agg.	Team 2	1st leg	2nd leg
Íntimo Cable Visión	2–1	Unión Huaral	2–1	–
Unión Supe	3–1	Atlético Chalaco	2–1	1–0

==== Regional Final ====
Team 1	Score	Team 2
Íntimo Cable Visión	2–1	Unión Supe

*The 2nd leg between Unión Huaral and Íntimo Cable Visión was suspended by the FPF because of some incidents with the crowd in the first game. Cable Visión qualified for the next round

=== Region V ===
Region V includes qualified teams from Junín, Pasco and Huánuco region.

==== Group A ====
Pos	Team	Pld	W	D	L	GF	GA	GD	Pts	Qualification	SHU	DMY	LEÓ
1	Sport Huancayo	4	2	0	2	8	4	+4	6	National stage		3–0	4–1
2	Deportivo Municipal (Yanahuanca)	4	2	0	2	3	4	−1	6		1–0		2–0
3	León de Huánuco	4	2	0	2	4	7	−3	6		2–1	1–0	

Legend: Blue = home team win; Yellow = draw; Red = away team win.

===== Tiebreakers =====
Team 1	Score	Team 2
Sport Huancayo	2–1	León de Huánuco
Deportivo Municipal (Yanahuanca)	1–3	Sport Huancayo

==== Group B ====
Pos	Team	Pld	W	D	L	GF	GA	GD	Pts	Qualification	ALI	WAN	UMI
1	Alianza Universidad	4	3	0	1	10	4	+6	9	National stage		3–0	2–0
2	Wanka	4	3	0	1	9	6	+3	9		4–3		3–0
3	Unión Minas	4	0	0	4	0	9	−9	0		0–2	0–2	

Legend: Blue = home team win; Yellow = draw; Red = away team win.

===== Tiebreaker =====
Team 1	Score	Team 2
Alianza Universidad	1–1 (5–4 p)	Wanka

=== Region VI ===
Region VI includes qualified teams from Ayacucho, Huancavelica and Ica region. Two teams qualified from this stage.

==== Group A ====
Pos	Team	Pld	W	D	L	GF	GA	GD	Pts	Qualification	DMA	ADU	DMH
1	Deportivo Municipal (Acoria)	4	2	0	2	3	12	−9	6	National stage		1–0	3–1
2	UNICA	4	1	2	1	12	3	+9	5		10–0		1–1
3	Deportivo Municipal (Huamanga)	4	1	2	1	4	4	0	5		2–1	1–1	

Legend: Blue = home team win; Yellow = draw; Red = away team win.

==== Group B ====
Pos	Team	Pld	W	D	L	GF	GA	GD	Pts	Qualification	SPH	JVG	MAC
1	Sport Huamanga	4	3	1	0	6	1	+5	10	National stage		2–0	1–0
2	Juventud Guadalupe	4	2	1	1	4	2	+2	7		0–0		3–0
3	Deportivo Municipal (Acobamba)	4	0	0	4	1	8	−7	0		1–3	0–1	

Legend: Blue = home team win; Yellow = draw; Red = away team win.

=== Region VII ===
Region VII includes qualified teams from Arequipa, Moquegua and Tacna region.

==== Group A ====
Pos	Team	Pld	W	D	L	GF	GA	GD	Pts	Qualification	COB	DPI	DÍN
1	Cobresol	4	3	0	1	16	4	+12	9	Región VII - Semifinals		2–0	9–0
2	Defensor Piérola	4	2	1	1	8	4	+4	7	Región VII - Semifinals	3–1		4–0
3	Dínamo de Solabaya	4	0	1	3	2	18	−16	1		1–4	1–1	

Legend: Blue = home team win; Yellow = draw; Red = away team win.

==== Group B ====
Pos	Team	Pld	W	D	L	GF	GA	GD	Pts	Qualification	IDU	HUR	DML
1	IDUNSA	4	3	1	0	15	3	+12	10	Región VII - Semifinals		4–0	4–0
2	Atlético Huracán	4	1	1	2	9	10	−1	4	Región VII - Semifinals	2–2		4–0
3	Deportivo Municipal (Locumba)	4	1	0	3	5	16	−11	3		1–5	4–3	

Legend: Blue = home team win; Yellow = draw; Red = away team win.

==== Semifinals ====
Team 1	Agg.	Team 2	1st leg	2nd leg
IDUNSA	4–2	Defensor Piérola	1–2	3–0
Atlético Huracán	0–14	Cobresol	0–7	0–7

==== Regional Final ====
Team 1	Score	Team 2
IDUNSA	0–0 (4–5 p)	Cobresol

=== Region VIII ===
Region VIII includes qualified teams from Apurimac, Cusco, Madre de Dios and Puno region.

==== Group A ====
Pos	Team	Pld	W	D	L	GF	GA	GD	Pts	Qualification	PSR	DPG	DPE	MIN
1	Policial Santa Rosa	6	4	1	1	12	6	+6	13	National stage		0–0	2–0	4–0
2	Deportivo Garcilaso	6	3	2	1	9	6	+3	11		1–2		3–2	3–2
3	Deportivo Educación	5	1	1	3	5	7	−2	4		3–1	0–0		W.O.
4	MINSA	5	1	0	4	5	12	−7	3		2–3	0–2	1–0	

Legend: Blue = home team win; Yellow = draw; Red = away team win.

==== Group B ====
Pos	Team	Pld	W	D	L	GF	GA	GD	Pts	Qualification	DRJ	SPM	SRQ	ALF	JJT
1	Diablos Rojos	8	5	2	1	15	11	+4	17	National stage		3–3	2–1	3–1	2–1
2	Sport Municipal	8	5	1	2	17	8	+9	16		2–1		2–0	5–0	2–1
3	Santa Rosa (Quillabamba)	7	2	1	4	7	9	−2	7		0–1	2–1		1–2	3–1
4	Alfonso Ugarte	8	2	1	5	8	15	−7	7		1–2	0–2	0–0		3–0
5	Juventud La Joya	7	2	1	4	9	13	−4	7		2–2	1–0	W.O.	3–0	

Legend: Blue = home team win; Yellow = draw; Red = away team win.

==== Regional Final ====
Team 1	Agg.	Team 2	1st leg	2nd leg
Diablos Rojos	4–0	Policial Santa Rosa	2–0	2–0

== National Stage ==
The National Stage started on November 8. This stage had two knockout rounds and four-team group stage. The winners and runners-up of the National Stage will be promoted to the First Division. The two semifinalists as well as the best quarterfinalist will be promoted to the Second Division.

Round of 16
Defensor Porvenir	0	2	2
Atlético Torino	3	1	4
Comerciantes Unidos	1	0	1
Renovación Pacífico	0	4	4
Íntimo Cable Visión	0	2	2
Tecnológico	1	0	1
Unión Supe	1	1	2 (2)
CNI	1	1	2 (4)
Sport Huamanga	3	1	4 (3)
Alianza Universidad	1	3	4 (1)
Deportivo Municipal (A)	0	0	0
Sport Huancayo	1	3	4
Policial Santa Rosa	1	0	1
Cobresol	1	3	4
IDUNSA	1	1	2
Diablos Rojos	0	1	1

Quarterfinals
Atlético Torino (a)	2	1	3
Renovación Pacífico	2	1	3
Íntimo Cable Visión	0	3	3
CNI (a)	1	2	3
Sport Huamanga	0	4	4
Sport Huancayo (a)	3	1	4
Cobresol (a)	1	4	5
IDUNSA	5	0	5

Final Group
Atlético Torino
CNI
Sport Huancayo
Cobresol

Champion & Runner-Up
Sport Huancayo
CNI

=== Round of 16 ===
Team 1	Agg.	Team 2	1st leg	2nd leg
Defensor Porvenir	2–4	Atlético Torino	0–3	2–1
Comerciantes Unidos	1–4	Renovación Pacífico	1–0	0–4
Tecnológico	1–2	Íntimo Cable Visión	1–0	0–2
Unión Supe	2–2 (2–4 p)	CNI	1–1	1–1
Sport Huamanga	4–4 (3–1 p)	Alianza Universidad	3–1	1–3
Deportivo Municipal (Acoria)	0–4	Sport Huancayo	0–1	0–3
Policial Santa Rosa	1–4	Cobresol	1–1	0–3
IDUNSA	2–1	Diablos Rojos	1–0	1–1

=== Quarterfinals ===
Team 1	Agg.	Team 2	1st leg	2nd leg
Renovación Pacífico	3–3 (a)	Atlético Torino	2–2	1–1
CNI	3–3 (a)	Íntimo Cable Visión	1–0	2–3
Sport Huancayo	4–4 (a)	Carlos A. Mannucci	3–0	1–4
IDUNSA	5–5 (a)	Cobresol	5–1	0–4

=== Final group stage ===
Pos	Team	Pld	W	D	L	GF	GA	GD	Pts	Promotion
1	Sport Huancayo	3	2	0	1	4	1	+3	6	Promotion to Torneo Descentralizado
2	CNI	3	1	2	0	4	3	+1	5	Promotion to Torneo Descentralizado
3	Atlético Torino	3	1	0	2	3	4	−1	3	
4	Cobresol	3	0	1	2	4	6	−2	1	

==== Round 1 ====
2008-12-07	Sport Huancayo	0–1	CNI	Estadio Monumental "U", Lima
13:00 UTC-5

2008-12-07	Atlético Torino	2–1	Cobresol	Estadio Monumental "U", Lima
15:30 UTC-5

==== Round 2 ====
2008-12-09	Sport Huancayo	2–0	Atlético Torino	Estadio Monumental "U", Lima
18:00 UTC-5

2008-12-09	Cobresol	2–2	CNI	Estadio Monumental "U", Lima
20:30 UTC-5

==== Round 3 ====
2008-12-11	Sport Huancayo	2–0	Cobresol	Estadio Monumental "U", Lima
18:00 UTC-5

2008-12-11	Atlético Torino	1–1	CNI	Estadio Monumental "U", Lima
20:30 UTC-5

== See also ==
- 2008 Torneo Descentralizado
- 2008 Peruvian Segunda División
