= Paucara =

Paucara can refer to:

- Adelio Paucara, Bolivian educator and politician
- Paucará District, district of Acobamba Province, Peru

- Paucará, capital of the district
