= Froebel Deportes =

- Full name: Froebel Deportes Club
- Nickname(s): El equipo colegial
- Founded: 2003
- Ground: Estadio Ciudad de Cumaná, Ayacucho
- Capacity: 15,000
- League: Copa Perú
Home colours	Away colours

Froebel Deportes is a Peruvian football club, playing in the city of Ayacucho, Peru.

== History ==
In the 2009 Copa Perú, Froebel Deportes was champion of the Region VI when defeated to Deportivo Municipal de Huamanga, and the club advanced to the National Stage where was eliminated by León de Huánuco.

== Coach ==
- (Peru) Jorge Gamarra (2010)

== Honours ==
=== National ===
- Región VI: 1

Winners (1): 2009

- Liga Departamental de Ayacucho: 1

Winners (1): 2010
Runner-up (2): 2007, 2009

- Liga Superior de Ayacucho: 0

Runner-up (1): 2009

== See also ==
- List of football clubs in Peru
- Peruvian football league system
