= Juventud La Rural =

Peruvian football club

- Full name: Club Juventud La Rural
- Founded: January 1, 1946
- Manager: Daniel Ruiz
- League: Copa Perú
Home colours

Juventud La Rural is a Peruvian football club, playing in the city of Surco, Lima, Peru.

The club is the biggest of Surco city, and one of the biggest in Lima Province.

The club was founded in 1946 and plays in the Copa Perú, which is the third division of the Peruvian league.

== History ==
In the 2009 Copa Perú, the club qualified to the National Stage, but was eliminated by Tecnológico of Pucallpa.

== Honours ==
- Región IV: 0

Runner-up (1): 2009

- Liga Departamental de Lima: 1

Winners (1): 2009

- Liga Provincial de Lima: 0

Runner-up (1): 2009

- Liga Distrital de Surco: 3

Winners (3): 1997, 1999, 2009

== See also ==
- List of football clubs in Peru
- Peruvian football league system
