= 2025 Ligas Departamentales del Perú =

Ligas Departamentales del Peru
- Season: 2025

The 2025 Ligas Departamentales, the fifth division of Peruvian football, were played by variable number teams by Departament. The champions and runners-up of each department qualified for the national stage of the 2025 Copa Perú.

== Liga Departamental de Amazonas ==
=== First Stage ===
Team 1	Agg.	Team 2	1st leg	2nd leg
Sachapuyos	5–1	Deportivo Onchic	3–1	2–0
Tingo Kuelap	1–4	Unión Comercial	0–2	1–2
San Valentín de Shucayacu	7–3	Sport Quiocta	5–0	2–3
Señor de los Milagros (Longar)	4–6	Amazonas FC	2–0	2–6
Academia Kala Goal	2–4	Unión Awajún	2–1	0–3
Deportivo Águila (Chinganaza)	6–10	Bagua Grande	3–1	3–9
Nueva Generación (Nuevo Cutervo)	4–5	Bagua FC	3–2	1–3

=== Group Stage ===
==== Group A ====
Pos	Team	Pld	W	D	L	GF	GA	GD	Pts	Qualification or relegation	AMA	BAG	VAL	COM
1	Amazonas FC	5	5	0	0	21	5	+16	15	Advance to 2025 Copa Perú		3–1	11–2	2–0
2	Bagua Grande	5	3	0	2	10	8	+2	9		0–1		n.p.	4–2
3	San Valentín de Shucayacu	5	1	0	4	10	22	−12	3		2–4	1–2		2–3
4	Unión Comercial	5	1	0	4	8	14	−6	3		n.p.	1–3	2–3	

Legend: Blue = home team win; Yellow = draw; Red = away team win.
Rules for classification: 1) Points; 2) Goal difference; 3) Goals for; 4) Fair play points; 5) Drawing of lots.

==== Group B ====
Pos	Team	Pld	W	D	L	GF	GA	GD	Pts	Qualification or relegation	BAG	SAC	NUE	UNI
1	Bagua FC	6	4	2	0	13	5	+8	14	Advance to 2025 Copa Perú		1–1	1–0	3–1
2	Sachapuyos	6	3	1	2	18	11	+7	10		0–2		0–1	11–3
3	Nueva Generación (Nuevo Cutervo)	5	2	1	2	8	8	0	7		2–2	1–2		4–3
4	Unión Awajún	5	0	0	5	11	26	−15	0		1–4	3–4	n.p.	

Legend: Blue = home team win; Yellow = draw; Red = away team win.
Rules for classification: 1) Points; 2) Goal difference; 3) Goals for; 4) Fair play points; 5) Drawing of lots.

=== Final ===
Team 1	Agg.	Team 2	1st leg	2nd leg
Amazonas FC	2–6	Bagua FC	0–3	2–3

== Liga Departamental de Áncash ==
=== Repechaje ===
Team 1	Agg.	Team 2	1st leg	2nd leg
Deportivo Alpas	2–4	Sporting Club Huaraz	0–0	2–4
Defensor Convento	2–9	Santa Cruz de Pichiu	1–3	1–6
Unión Milagro	2–5	Deportivo Conchucos	2–1	0–4
Urb. Santa Gertrudis	5–2	Unión Cahua	5–0	0–2
Unión Huallhua	1–2	Primavera	0–1	1–1
Colquioc Llampa	2–5	Defensor Huarmey	0–4	2–1

=== First Stage ===
Team 1	Agg.	Team 2	1st leg	2nd leg
Defensor Huarmey	1–15	Real Puerto Chimbote	1–7	0–8
Juvenil San Ildefonso	2–7	ADECO	2–1	0–6
Alianza Vicos	5–3	FC Yacupampa	4–1	1–2
Juventud Tupac Amaru	6–12	Señor de los Milagros	4–4	2–8
Huaraz FC	3–1	Urb. Santa Gertrudis	1–0	2–1
Corazón de Arhuay	5–1	Cultural Primavera	3–1	2–0
Real Independiente	11–5	Santa Cruz de Pichiu	3–0	8–5
Representativo Chilcas	1–1 (4–2 p)	Juventus de Independencia	1–0	0–1
Independiente Parco	0–9	Alianza Poyor	0–6	0–3
Sport Ayash Huamanin	6–5	Deportivo Primavera	6–3	0–2
Deportivo Raymondi	8–1	Sporting Club Huaraz	2–0	6–1
Sport Rosario de Paty	0–9	José Gálvez	0–2	0–7
Juventud La Unión	4–0	Sport Miramar	1–0	3–0
Unión Garlero	8–4	Academia Sarita Colonia	7–1	1–3
Deprotivo Obraje	4–5	Deportivo Conchucos	4–1	0–4
Olivar FC	3–1	River Santa	1–0	2–1

=== Round of 16 ===
Team 1	Agg.	Team 2	1st leg	2nd leg
Señor de los Milagros	0–5	Olivar FC	0–2	0–3
Deportivo Raymondi	3–0	ADECO	2–0	1–0
Corazón de Arhuay	2–4	Alianza Vicos	0–1	2–3
Huaraz FC	2–5	Real Independiente	0–2	2–3
Unión Garlero	3–2	Deportivo Conchucos	1–1	2–1
José Gálvez	2–1	Juventud La Unión	2–0	0–1
Representativo Chilcas	2–8	Real Puerto Chimbote	2–2	0–6
Alianza Poyor	2–6	Sport Ayash Huamanin	1–0	1–6

=== Quarterfinals ===
Team 1	Agg.	Team 2	1st leg	2nd leg
Alianza Vicos	3–9	Real Puerto Chimbote	1–4	2–5
Unión Garlero	3–7	Real Independiente	1–2	2–5
Deportivo Raymondi	3–2	José Gálvez	3–1	0–1
Olivar FC	4–10	Sport Ayash Huamanin	3–5	1–5

=== Semifinals ===
Team 1	Agg.	Team 2	1st leg	2nd leg
Deportivo Raymondi	2–5	Sport Ayash Huamanin	2–2	0–3
Real Independiente	2–2 (1–4 p)	Real Puerto Chimbote	2–0	0–2

=== Third Place ===
Team 1	Score	Team 2
Real Independiente	7–1	Deportivo Raymondi

=== Final ===
Team 1	Agg.	Team 2	1st leg	2nd leg
Real Puerto Chimbote	2–7	Sport Ayash Huamanin	1–4	1–3

== Liga Departamental de Apurímac ==
=== First Stage ===
Team 1	Agg.	Team 2	1st leg	2nd leg
Cultural Huancarama	1–1 (5–3 p)	Deporivo Municipal (Grau)	1–1	0–0
Deportivo Yawarmayo (Curasco)	3–15	Peña Sport	1–7	2–8
Defensor Qollana	2–2 (5–6 p)	Unión Pocohuanca	2–1	0–1
Patrón Santiago	6–2	Familia Zanabria	4–1	2–1
Cultural Poltoccsa	1–2	Hijos de Piscobamba	1–2	0–0
Juventud San Lorenzo	2–6	Instituto Apurímac	1–2	1–4

=== Quarterfinals ===
Team 1	Agg.	Team 2	1st leg	2nd leg
Cultural Huancarama	7–3	Unión Pocohuanca	3–2	4–1
Hijos de Piscobamba	0–0 (4–3 p)	Deportivo Puya Raymondi	0–0	0–0
Unión Minas Pamputa	1–2	Instituto Apurímac	0–1	1–1
Patrón Santiago	3–17	Peña Sport	2–6	1–11

=== Final Group ===
Pos	Team	Pld	W	D	L	GF	GA	GD	Pts	Qualification or relegation	INS	HUA	HIJ	PEÑ
1	Instituto Apurímac	6	3	2	1	7	4	+3	11	Advance to 2025 Copa Perú		3–2	0–1	2–0
2	Cultural Huancarama	6	2	3	1	10	6	+4	9	Advance to 2025 Copa Perú	1–1		3–1	3–0
3	Hijos de Piscobamba	6	2	2	2	3	6	−3	8	Advance to 2025 Copa Perú	0–0	0–0		1–0
4	Peña Sport	6	1	1	4	4	8	−4	4		0–1	1–1	3–0	

Legend: Blue = home team win; Yellow = draw; Red = away team win.
Rules for classification: 1) Points; 2) Goal difference; 3) Goals for; 4) Fair play points; 5) Drawing of lots.

== Liga Departamental de Arequipa ==
=== First Stage ===
Team 1	Agg.	Team 2	1st leg	2nd leg
Deportivo Colón	2–2 (5–3 p)	Espiga Dorada	1–2	1–0
Sport El Alto	5–4	Deportivo Estrella	1–2	2–4
Tiznados	3–5	Viargoca	1–2	4–2
Deportivo Camaná	2–3	Alto Inclán	1–1	2–1
Juventud Bella Unión	5–5 (6–7 p)	Deportivo Vallecito	5–2	0–3
Rocket Boys	2–6	FD Galaxy	1–4	2–1
Universitario de Papachacra	2–7	Amigos de la PNP	2–2	5–0

=== Quarterfinals ===
Team 1	Agg.	Team 2	1st leg	2nd leg
FD Galaxy	5–4	Alto Inclán	3–0	2–4
Deportivo Colón	2–2 (2–4 p)	Amigos de la PNP	1–2	1–0
Viargoca	7–3	Deportivo Vallecito	6–1	1–2
Juventud Bella Unión	2–11	Sport El Alto	2–2	0–9

=== Final Group ===
Pos	Team	Pld	W	D	L	GF	GA	GD	Pts	Qualification or relegation	AMI	VIA	GAL	SEA
1	Amigos de la PNP	6	5	0	1	15	3	+12	15	Advance to 2025 Copa Perú		3–0	3–0	4–0
2	Viargoca	6	5	0	1	17	9	+8	15	Advance to 2025 Copa Perú	2–1		4–0	4–1
3	FD Galaxy	6	2	0	4	9	14	−5	6	Advance to 2025 Copa Perú	0–2	2–3		5–1
4	Sport El Alto	6	0	0	6	6	21	−15	0		1–2	2–4	1–2	

Legend: Blue = home team win; Yellow = draw; Red = away team win.
Rules for classification: 1) Points; 2) Goal difference; 3) Goals for; 4) Fair play points; 5) Drawing of lots.

==== Tiebreaker ====
Team 1	Score	Team 2
Amigos de la PNP	0–0 (4–5 p)	Viargoca

== Liga Departamental de Ayacucho ==
=== First Stage ===
Team 1	Agg.	Team 2	1st leg	2nd leg
Los Lobos de Manitea	5–2	San Pedro de Chilcayocc	2–2	3–0
Atlético de Tintay	0–11	Defensor Patibamba	0–9	0–2
Sport Morochucos	7–4	Juventud Miraflores	5–1	2–3
Sarhua FC	2–1	San Juan de Carapo	2–0	0–1
Sport Qollpacucho	4–1	Sport Vilca	4–0	0–1
Luca Sport	1–10	Señor de Quinuapata	1–0	0–10
Sport Cáceres	3–6	Cultural Huracán	1–3	2–3
Sport Ochoa	9–2	FC Huamanccasa	6–2	3–0
FC Tambo	4–0	Deportivo Municipal (Uchuraccay)	1–0	3–0
Halcones de Pacomarca	1–9	Sport Colca	1–3	0–6

=== Round of 16 ===
Team 1	Agg.	Team 2	1st leg	2nd leg
Defensor Patibamba	4–3	Deportivo Municipal (Uchuraccay)	1–0	3–3
Sport Colca	3–4	San Pedro de Chilcayoc	1–2	2–2
Luca Sport	3–1	Sport Ochoa	0–1	3–0
Sport Vilca	4–11	FC Tambo	3–8	1–3
Juventud Miraflores	2–3	Los Lobos de Manitea	1–0	1–3
Cultural Huracán	3–4	Señor de Quinuapata	2–1	1–3
Sarhua FC	2–3	Sport Mororchucos	1–1	1–2
Sport Qollpacucho	0–3	Sport Cáceres	0–1	0–2

=== Quarterfinals ===
Team 1	Agg.	Team 2	1st leg	2nd leg
Sport Cáceres	0–2	Defensor Patibamba	0–1	0–1
Los Lobos de Manitea	3–3 (3–5 p)	FC Tambo	1–1	2–2
San Pedro de Chilcayoc	2–3	Sport Morochucos	2–1	0–2
Luca Sport	4–4 (3–5 p)	Señor de Quinuapata	2–2	2–2

=== Semifinals ===
Team 1	Agg.	Team 2	1st leg	2nd leg
FC Tambo	2–5	Defensor Patibamba	0–3	2–2
Sport Morochucos	1–5	Señor de Quinuapata	0–2	1–3

=== Third Place ===
Team 1	Score	Team 2
FC Tambo	3–2	Sport Morochucos

=== Final ===
Team 1	Score	Team 2
Señor de Quinuapata	1–4	Defensor Patibamba

== Liga Departamental de Cajamarca ==
=== First Stage ===
Team 1	Agg.	Team 2	1st leg	2nd leg
Sporting Chancay	2–4	Gálvez FC	1–1	1–3
Ingeniería Máximo Nivel	9–1	Sport Rayo	7–0	2–1
Rosario Celendín	2–9	ADA Cajabamba	0–3	2–6
Juan Pardo y Miguel	3–4	UDEC	2–2	1–2
Los Pisadiablos	4–5	Santísima Trinidad	3–1	1–4
José Olaya (Contumazá)	3–11	Colonia Tongodina	1–7	2–4
Simón Bolívar (Santa Cruz)	2–10	Señor de los Milagros (Jaén)	1–1	1–9
Bracamoros	2–9	Las Palmas	2–6	0–3
Sport La Lima	1–3	Pueblo Nuevo	1–2	0–1
San Lorenzo	2–3	Unión San Ignacio	0–0	2–3
Juventud San Juan	3–7	Deportivo Municipal (San Juan)	3–3	0–4
Academia Pedro Nolasco	2–2	Tres Cruces	1–0	1–2
Atlético Chalaco (Chota)	6–0	Khaly Corazón	5–0	1–0

=== Second Stage ===
Team 1	Agg.	Team 2	1st leg	2nd leg
Santísima Trinidad	2–9	El Combe	2–5	0–4
UDEC	3–0	Colonia Tongodina	2–0	1–0
Ingeniería Máximo Nivel	3–3 (6–5 p)	Gálvez FC	2–3	1–0
Unión San Ignacio	1–8	ADA Cajabamba	1–0	0–8
Deportivo Municipal (San Juan)	0–6	Las Palmas	0–1	0–5
Señor de los Milagros (Jaén)	1–3	Atlético Chalaco (Chota)	0–0	1–3
Pueblo Nuevo	3–3 (7–6 p)	Academia Pedro Nolasco	1–2	2–1

=== Quarterfinals ===
Team 1	Agg.	Team 2	1st leg	2nd leg
Gálvez FC	2–7	ADA Cajabamba	2–4	W.O.
Pueblo Nuevo	2–10	El Combe	1–4	1–6
Ingeniería Máximo Nivel	1–3	Las Palmas	1–1	0–2
Atlético Chalaco (Chota)	0–1	UDEC	0–0	0–1

=== Semifinals ===
Team 1	Agg.	Team 2	1st leg	2nd leg
UDEC	1–7	ADA Cajabamba	1–3	0–4
Las Palmas	7–3	El Combe	2–1	5–2

=== Final ===
Team 1	Agg.	Team 2	1st leg	2nd leg
Las Palmas	4–4 (2–3 p)	ADA Cajabamba	3–2	1–2

== Liga Departamental de Callao ==
=== Group Stage ===
==== Group A ====
Pos	Team	Pld	W	D	L	GF	GA	GD	Pts	INT	JOB	C23	RC8
1	Íntimos de Reynoso	3	2	0	1	6	7	−1	6		2–1	3–2	
2	JOB 05	3	1	1	1	4	3	+1	4			1–1	2–0
3	Calle 23	3	1	1	1	4	4	0	4				1–0
4	Academia RC8	3	1	0	2	4	4	0	3	4–1			

Legend: Blue = home team win; Yellow = draw; Red = away team win.
Rules for classification: 1) Points; 2) Goal difference; 3) Goals for; 4) Fair play points; 5) Drawing of lots.

===== Tiebreaker =====
Team 1	Score	Team 2
JOB 05	2–2 (2–3 p)	Callao 23

==== Group B ====
Pos	Team	Pld	W	D	L	GF	GA	GD	Pts	PAL	DEF	SAB	PRO
1	Juventud Palmeiras	3	2	0	1	15	3	+12	6			4–0	11–1
2	Defensor Todos Unidos	3	2	0	1	7	4	+3	6	2–0			2–0
3	Full Sábado	3	2	0	1	6	8	−2	6		4–3		2–1
4	Juventud Progreso	3	0	0	3	2	15	−13	0				

Legend: Blue = home team win; Yellow = draw; Red = away team win.
Rules for classification: 1) Points; 2) Goal difference; 3) Goals for; 4) Fair play points; 5) Drawing of lots.

===== Tiebreaker =====
Team 1	Score	Team 2
Juventud Palmeiras	3–1	Full Sábado

==== Group C ====
Pos	Team	Pld	W	D	L	GF	GA	GD	Pts	JLP	EST	AGU	PAC
1	Juventud La Perla	3	2	0	1	5	4	+1	6		1–0	3–1	
2	Estrella Roja	3	1	1	1	3	3	0	4				2–1
3	Hacienda San Agustín	3	1	1	1	4	5	−1	4		1–1		2–1
4	Pachapool	3	1	0	2	5	5	0	3	3–1			

Legend: Blue = home team win; Yellow = draw; Red = away team win.
Rules for classification: 1) Points; 2) Goal difference; 3) Goals for; 4) Fair play points; 5) Drawing of lots.

===== Tiebreaker =====
Team 1	Score	Team 2
Hacienda San Agustín	2–2 (4–3 p)	Estrella Roja

==== Group D ====
Pos	Team	Pld	W	D	L	GF	GA	GD	Pts	CAL	GEN	SAN	AVI
1	Calidad Porteña	3	3	0	0	11	1	+10	9		5–1	2–0	4–0
2	Deportivo Gentlemen	3	2	0	1	8	8	0	6			3–2	4–1
3	Santa Marina Norte	3	0	1	2	4	7	−3	1				2–2
4	Aviar Soccer	3	0	1	2	3	10	−7	1				

Legend: Blue = home team win; Yellow = draw; Red = away team win.
Rules for classification: 1) Points; 2) Goal difference; 3) Goals for; 4) Fair play points; 5) Drawing of lots.

=== Quarterfinals ===
Team 1	Score	Team 2
Hacienda San Agustín	5–0	Íntimos de Reynoso
Juventud Palmeiras	6–0	Deportivo Gentlemen
Calidad Porteña	0–0 (5–3 p)	Defensor Todos Unidos
Calle 23	5–1	Juventud La Perla

=== Semifinals ===
Team 1	Score	Team 2
Calidad Porteña	3–0	Calle 23
Hacienda San Agustín	2–1	Juventud Palmeiras

=== Final ===
Team 1	Score	Team 2
Calidad Porteña	2–0	Hacienda San Agustín

== Liga Departamental de Cusco ==
=== Group Stage ===
==== Group A ====
Pos	Team	Pld	W	D	L	GF	GA	GD	Pts	JUE	UNI	QUE	TIK
1	Señor Justo Juez	6	5	0	1	18	5	+13	15		3–2	1–0	3–0
2	UNISPA	6	4	1	1	7	3	+4	13	1–0		2–0	1–0
3	Deportivo Quehuar	6	2	1	3	4	6	−2	7	1–2	0–0		2–1
4	Defensor Tika Huerta	6	0	0	6	2	17	−15	0	1–9	0–1	0–1	

Legend: Blue = home team win; Yellow = draw; Red = away team win.
Rules for classification: 1) Points; 2) Goal difference; 3) Goals for; 4) Fair play points; 5) Drawing of lots.

==== Group B ====
Pos	Team	Pld	W	D	L	GF	GA	GD	Pts	NUE	SAN	PAT	RIO
1	Nuevo Amanecer	6	5	0	1	13	4	+9	15		4–1	4–2	2–0
2	Social Santa Anta	6	3	2	1	8	7	+1	11	1–0		2–0	1–1
3	Patria Kcosñipata	6	2	1	3	9	11	−2	7	0–1	2–2		3–1
4	Rio Blanco Sauceda	6	0	1	5	3	11	−8	1	0–2	0–1	1–2	

Legend: Blue = home team win; Yellow = draw; Red = away team win.
Rules for classification: 1) Points; 2) Goal difference; 3) Goals for; 4) Fair play points; 5) Drawing of lots.

==== Group C ====
Pos	Team	Pld	W	D	L	GF	GA	GD	Pts	PAL	UNI	UAC	CUL
1	Atlético Palma Real	6	5	0	1	14	8	+6	15		3–2	3–2	3–1
2	Universitario Junior Cusipata	6	1	3	2	11	11	0	6	1–2		2–2	3–1
3	Universidad Andina	6	1	3	2	11	13	−2	6	0–3	2–2		4–2
4	Cultural Wiñay Llaqta Kunturkanki	6	1	2	3	8	12	−4	5	2–0	1–1	1–1	

Legend: Blue = home team win; Yellow = draw; Red = away team win.
Rules for classification: 1) Points; 2) Goal difference; 3) Goals for; 4) Fair play points; 5) Drawing of lots.

==== Group D ====
Pos	Team	Pld	W	D	L	GF	GA	GD	Pts	LID	MUN	AUD	RAC
1	Líder Ollanta	6	4	2	0	13	5	+8	14		0–0	2–1	3–0
2	Deportivo Municipal Megantoni	6	2	4	0	19	7	+12	10	3–3		4–0	8–0
3	Audaces Jhunior	6	2	1	3	10	10	0	7	1–2	1–1		4–0
4	Racing Ccayocca	6	0	1	5	4	24	−20	1	0–3	3–3	1–3	

Legend: Blue = home team win; Yellow = draw; Red = away team win.
Rules for classification: 1) Points; 2) Goal difference; 3) Goals for; 4) Fair play points; 5) Drawing of lots.

==== Group E ====
Pos	Team	Pld	W	D	L	GF	GA	GD	Pts	VIN	LIB	CHI	REA
1	Vinicunca FC	6	4	1	1	14	6	+8	13		1–1	2–1	5–1
2	Sport Liberales	6	3	1	2	14	8	+6	10	2–4		2–0	4–0
3	Chilloroya Velille	6	3	0	3	10	8	+2	9	0–2	2–1		3–0
4	Real Pachatusan	6	1	0	5	5	20	−15	3	3–1	0–3	1–4	

Legend: Blue = home team win; Yellow = draw; Red = away team win.
Rules for classification: 1) Points; 2) Goal difference; 3) Goals for; 4) Fair play points; 5) Drawing of lots.

==== Group F ====
Pos	Team	Pld	W	D	L	GF	GA	GD	Pts	MUN	UNI	EST	QUI
1	Deportivo Múnich Sol Naciente	6	5	0	1	10	4	+6	15		0–1	2–1	3–1
2	Unión Porvenir Coya	6	3	1	2	8	10	−2	10	0–1		1–1	3–2
3	Juventus Estrella	6	2	1	3	13	10	+3	7	0–2	4–0		5–2
4	Juventus Quiquijana	6	1	0	5	11	18	−7	3	1–2	2–3	3–2	

Legend: Blue = home team win; Yellow = draw; Red = away team win.
Rules for classification: 1) Points; 2) Goal difference; 3) Goals for; 4) Fair play points; 5) Drawing of lots.

=== Quarterfinals ===
Team 1	Agg.	Team 2	1st leg	2nd leg
Nuevo Amanecer	2–2 (1–3 p)	Señor Justo Juez	2–0	0–2
Atlético Palma Real	2–2 (3–4 p)	UNISPA	1–0	1–2
Vinicunca FC	3–2	Líder Ollanta	2–2	1–0
Deportivo Múnich Sol Naciente	3–1	Deportivo Municipal Megatoni	1–1	2–0

=== Semifinals ===
Team 1	Agg.	Team 2	1st leg	2nd leg
Deportivo Múnich Sol Naciente	2–2 (4–3 p)	Vinicunca FC	1–1	1–1
UNISPA	2–2 (5–4 p)	Señor Justo Juez	2–2	not played

=== Third Place ===
Team 1	Score	Team 2
Señor Justo Juez	4–1	Vinicunca FC

=== Final ===
Team 1	Score	Team 2
Deportivo Múnich Sol Naciente	2–0	UNISPA

== Liga Departamental de Huancavelica ==
=== Standings ===
Pos	Team	Pld	W	D	L	GF	GA	GD	Pts	Qualification or relegation	MAC	DIA	UNH	FIM	NIÑ	PIL
1	Sport Machete	10	8	0	2	52	7	+45	24	Advance to 2025 Copa Perú		3–2	1–2	5–0	2–0	8–0
2	Diablos Rojos	10	8	0	2	29	10	+19	24	Advance to 2025 Copa Perú	1–2		4–1	4–2	3–0	3–0
3	UNH	9	6	0	3	16	12	+4	18		2–1	0–1		3–1	3–2	2–0
4	FIMCA UNH	10	5	0	5	14	20	−6	15		0–4	1–2	2–0		3–0	2–1
5	Niño Jesús	10	1	0	9	5	26	−21	3		0–3	0–3	0–3	1–2		0–3
6	Unión Pillcosay	9	1	0	8	6	47	−41	3		0–23	1–6	—	0–1	1–2	

Legend: Blue = home team win; Yellow = draw; Red = away team win.
Rules for classification: 1) Points; 2) Goal difference; 3) Goals for; 4) Fair play points; 5) Drawing of lots.

== Liga Departamental de Huánuco ==
=== First Stage ===
Team 1	Agg.	Team 2	1st leg	2nd leg
Miguel Grau UDH	4–4	Sport Sigma	2–2	2–2
Social Muña	1–3	León de Huánuco	1–0	0–3
Deportivo Municipal (Chacos)	5–1	UNHEVAL	3–0	2–1
Castle	2–1	Deportivo Pujay	1–0	1–1
Constructores de Uchiza	2–4	Auca FC	2–2	0–2
Mariano Santos	1–5	Defensor Progreso	0–2	1–3
Juventud La Palma	8–2	Terror de la Selva	5–1	3–1
Alianza Aucayacu	2–2	Social Molope	1–1	1–1
Deportivo Cervantes	5–2	Deportivo Verdecocha	5–2	W.O.
Familia Caqui	0–6	Cultural Santa Ana	0–3	0–3

=== Second Stage ===
Team 1	Agg.	Team 2	1st leg	2nd leg
Cultural Santa Ana	3–4	Miguel Grau UDH	2–1	1–3
Defensor Progreso	0–2	Castle	0–1	0–1
Deportivo Cervantes	2–3	Alianza Aucayacu	1–1	1–2
Auca FC	2–0	León de Huánuco	1–0	1–0
Juventud La Palma	3–3 (3–4 p)	Deportivo Municipal (Chacos)	2–2	1–1

=== Third Stage ===
Team 1	Agg.	Team 2	1st leg	2nd leg
Castle	2–4	Miguel Grau UDH	1–3	1–1
León de Huánuco	4–2	Alianza Aucayacu	3–2	1–0
Auca FC	3–3	Deportivo Municipal (Chacos)	1–1	2–2

=== Semifinal ===
Team 1	Agg.	Team 2	1st leg	2nd leg
Miguel Grau UDH	5–5 (3–2 p)	Deportivo Municipal (Chacos)	4–2	1–3

=== Final ===
Team 1	Agg.	Team 2	1st leg	2nd leg
León de Huánuco	1–8	Miguel Grau UDH	1–4	0–4

== Liga Departamental de Ica ==
=== First Stage ===
Team 1	Agg.	Team 2	1st leg	2nd leg
Alianza Pisco	6–1	Defensor Alfonso Ugarte	2–0	4–1
Juventud Ccontacc	2–1	Juventud Santa Fe	1–1	1–0
Independiente Cantayo	3–3	Sport Nacional	3–2	0–1
AT Agropecuarios	3–5	Deportivo Puquio	1–3	2–2
Sport Puerto Aéreo	3–1	Amigos del Barrio	1–1	2–0
Juventud Progreso	0–3	Manuel Gonzáles Prada	0–0	0–3

=== Quarterfinals ===
Team 1	Agg.	Team 2	1st leg	2nd leg
Juventud Santa Fe	2–2 (5–6 p)	Independiente Cantayo	1–1	1–1
Deportivo Puquio	3–3 (2–4 p)	Sport Puerto Aéreo	1–2	2–1
Sport Nacional	2–3	Alianza Pisco	1–1	1–2
Manuel Gonzáles Prada	2–3	Juventud Ccontacc	1–1	1–2

=== Semifinals ===
Team 1	Agg.	Team 2	1st leg	2nd leg
Independiente Cantayo	1–3	Alianza Pisco	1–1	0–2
Juventud Ccontacc	3–1	Sport Puerto Aéreo	0–1	3–0

=== Third Place ===
Team 1	Score	Team 2
Sport Puerto Aéreo	2–1	Independiente Cantayo

=== Final ===
Team 1	Score	Team 2
Alianza Pisco	1–0	Juventud Ccontacc

== Liga Departamental de Junín ==
=== First Stage ===
==== Group A ====
Pos	Team	Pld	W	D	L	GF	GA	GD	Pts	ROS	ANT	RAC	PUC
1	Rosario Unión	3	3	0	0	8	1	+7	9		4–1		3–0
2	Academia San Antonio	3	2	0	1	5	6	−1	6				2–1
3	Racing Satipo	3	1	0	2	4	5	−1	3	0–1	1–2		
4	Deportivo Pucará	3	0	0	3	3	8	−5	0			2–3	

Legend: Blue = home team win; Yellow = draw; Red = away team win.
Rules for classification: 1) Points; 2) Goal difference; 3) Goals for; 4) Fair play points; 5) Drawing of lots.

==== Group B ====
Pos	Team	Pld	W	D	L	GF	GA	GD	Pts	POM	JAL	AVA	COL
1	Unión Juventud Pomacocha	3	2	1	0	3	1	+2	7		2–1	0–0	
2	Juventud Alianza	3	2	0	1	7	5	+2	6	0–1		3–1	
3	Deportivo Avalancha	3	0	2	1	2	4	−2	2				1–1
4	Alianza Colcabamba	3	0	1	2	5	7	−2	1		3–4		

Legend: Blue = home team win; Yellow = draw; Red = away team win.
Rules for classification: 1) Points; 2) Goal difference; 3) Goals for; 4) Fair play points; 5) Drawing of lots.

==== Group C ====
Pos	Team	Pld	W	D	L	GF	GA	GD	Pts	ASM	PRO	VIC	EST
1	Atlético Suma Motors	3	3	0	0	16	2	+14	9		2–1	5–1	
2	Progreso Muruhuay	3	1	1	1	6	4	+2	4				3–0
3	Deportivo La Victoria	3	1	1	1	6	8	−2	4		2–2		3–1
4	Estudiantil San Juan	3	0	0	3	1	15	−14	0	0–9			

Legend: Blue = home team win; Yellow = draw; Red = away team win.
Rules for classification: 1) Points; 2) Goal difference; 3) Goals for; 4) Fair play points; 5) Drawing of lots.

==== Group D ====
Pos	Team	Pld	W	D	L	GF	GA	GD	Pts	DEF	MUN	FAM	CES
1	Defensor Pichanaki	3	2	1	0	7	4	+3	7		2–2		3–1
2	Deportivo Municipal (Usibamba)	3	1	1	1	6	6	0	4			2–1	
3	Familia Estrella	3	1	0	2	3	4	−1	3	1–2			
4	CESA	3	1	0	2	4	6	−2	3		3–2	0–1	

Legend: Blue = home team win; Yellow = draw; Red = away team win.
Rules for classification: 1) Points; 2) Goal difference; 3) Goals for; 4) Fair play points; 5) Drawing of lots.

==== Group E ====
Pos	Team	Pld	W	D	L	GF	GA	GD	Pts	GAV	CHA	OLA	DEF
1	Sport Gavilán	3	2	1	0	2	0	+2	7		1–0		1–0
2	Atlético Chanchamayo	3	1	1	1	2	2	0	4			1–0	1–1
3	José Olaya Chaupimarca	3	0	2	1	0	1	−1	2	0–0			
4	Defensor Cormis	3	0	2	1	1	2	−1	2			0–0	

Legend: Blue = home team win; Yellow = draw; Red = away team win.
Rules for classification: 1) Points; 2) Goal difference; 3) Goals for; 4) Fair play points; 5) Drawing of lots.

===== Tiebreaker =====
Team 1	Score	Team 2
José Olaya Chaupimarca	3–0	Defensor Cormis

=== Second Stage ===
==== Group A ====
Pos	Team	Pld	W	D	L	GF	GA	GD	Pts	POM	ROS	DEF	PRO
1	Unión Juventud Pomacocha	3	2	0	1	5	2	+3	6			2–0	
2	Rosario Unión	3	2	0	1	5	2	+3	6	2–0			2–0
3	Defensor Pichanaki	3	2	0	1	5	3	+2	6		2–1		3–0
4	Progreso Muruhuay	3	0	0	3	0	8	−8	0	0–3			

Legend: Blue = home team win; Yellow = draw; Red = away team win.
Rules for classification: 1) Points; 2) Goal difference; 3) Goals for; 4) Fair play points; 5) Drawing of lots.

===== Tiebreaker =====
Team 1	Score	Team 2
Unión Juventud Pomacocha	2–1	Rosario Unión

==== Group B ====
Pos	Team	Pld	W	D	L	GF	GA	GD	Pts	ASM	ANT	GAV	JAL
1	Atlético Suma Motors	3	3	0	0	8	2	+6	9		2–1		4–0
2	Academia San Antonio	3	2	0	1	8	4	+4	6				3–1
3	Sport Gavilán	3	1	0	2	3	6	−3	3	1–2	1–4		
4	Juventud Alianza	3	0	0	3	1	7	−6	0			0–1	

Legend: Blue = home team win; Yellow = draw; Red = away team win.
Rules for classification: 1) Points; 2) Goal difference; 3) Goals for; 4) Fair play points; 5) Drawing of lots.

==== Group C ====
Pos	Team	Pld	W	D	L	GF	GA	GD	Pts	CES	OLA	RAC	AVA
1	CESA	3	2	1	0	5	3	+2	7			4–3	1–0
2	José Olaya Chaupimarca	3	1	2	0	5	2	+3	5	0–0			
3	Racing Satipo	3	0	2	1	6	8	−2	2		0–0		
4	Deportivo Avalancha	3	0	1	2	5	9	−4	1		2–5	3–3	

Legend: Blue = home team win; Yellow = draw; Red = away team win.
Rules for classification: 1) Points; 2) Goal difference; 3) Goals for; 4) Fair play points; 5) Drawing of lots.

==== Group D ====
Pos	Team	Pld	W	D	L	GF	GA	GD	Pts	CHA	FAM	MUN	VIC
1	Atlético Chanchamayo	3	2	1	0	6	3	+3	7		2–0	1–1	
2	Familia Estrella	3	2	0	1	4	3	+1	6			1–0	
3	Deportivo Municipal (Usibamba)	3	1	1	1	5	3	+2	4				4–1
4	Deportivo La Victoria	3	0	0	3	4	10	−6	0	2–3	1–3		

Legend: Blue = home team win; Yellow = draw; Red = away team win.
Rules for classification: 1) Points; 2) Goal difference; 3) Goals for; 4) Fair play points; 5) Drawing of lots.

===== Tiebreaker =====
Team 1	Score	Team 2
Academia San Antonio	3–0	Familia Estrella

=== Hexagonal Final ===
Pos	Team	Pld	W	D	L	GF	GA	GD	Pts	Qualification or relegation	POM	CHA	ASM	CES	ANT	DEF
1	Unión Juventud Pomacocha	5	3	2	0	7	4	+3	11	Advance to 2025 Copa Perú					1–1	2–1
2	Atlético Chanchamayo	5	2	2	1	9	7	+2	8	Advance to 2025 Copa Perú	1–2					1–0
3	Atlético Suma Motors	5	1	3	1	6	4	+2	6	Advance to 2025 Copa Perú	1–2	1–1		0–0		
4	CESA	5	1	3	1	4	4	0	6		0–0	2–2				2–1
5	Academia San Antonio	5	1	2	2	7	9	−2	5			2–4	1–1	1–0		
6	Defensor Pichanaki	5	1	0	4	5	10	−5	3				0–3		3–2	

Legend: Blue = home team win; Yellow = draw; Red = away team win.
Rules for classification: 1) Points; 2) Goal difference; 3) Goals for; 4) Fair play points; 5) Drawing of lots.

==== Tiebreaker ====
Team 1	Score	Team 2
Atlético Suma Motors	1–0	CESA

== Liga Departamental de La Libertad ==
=== Group Stage ===
==== Group A ====
Pos	Team	Pld	W	D	L	GF	GA	GD	Pts	JBE	DEF	GRA	MUN
1	Juventud Bellavista	6	5	0	1	18	4	+14	15		0–2	6–0	3–0
2	Defensor Macabi	6	4	0	2	19	6	+13	12	0–3		7–0	5–0
3	Miguel Grau	6	2	1	3	7	19	−12	7	1–3	2–1		2–2
4	Sport Municipal	6	0	1	5	4	19	−15	1	1–3	1–4	0–2	

Legend: Blue = home team win; Yellow = draw; Red = away team win.
Rules for classification: 1) Points; 2) Goal difference; 3) Goals for; 4) Fair play points; 5) Drawing of lots.

==== Group B ====
Pos	Team	Pld	W	D	L	GF	GA	GD	Pts	RIV	AMA	CHA	PAB
1	Sport River	6	3	3	0	13	3	+10	12		1–1	1–1	7–0
2	Amaro Alza Arbulú	6	3	2	1	13	6	+7	11	0–1		4–1	3–3
3	Deportivo Nuevo Chao	5	1	2	2	6	9	−3	5	1–1	0–2		3–1
4	Real San Pablo	5	0	1	4	4	18	−14	1	0–2	0–3	W.O.	

Legend: Blue = home team win; Yellow = draw; Red = away team win.
Rules for classification: 1) Points; 2) Goal difference; 3) Goals for; 4) Fair play points; 5) Drawing of lots.

==== Group C ====
Pos	Team	Pld	W	D	L	GF	GA	GD	Pts	INC	SEM	SAL	VAS
1	El Inca	6	5	0	1	24	3	+21	15		2–0	2–0	10–1
2	Academia Juan Seminario	6	4	1	1	13	5	+8	13	2–1		6–1	4–1
3	El Salvador	6	2	1	3	13	11	+2	7	0–2	0–0		4–1
4	Vasko FC	6	0	0	6	3	34	−31	0	0–7	0–1	0–8	

Legend: Blue = home team win; Yellow = draw; Red = away team win.
Rules for classification: 1) Points; 2) Goal difference; 3) Goals for; 4) Fair play points; 5) Drawing of lots.

==== Group D ====
===== Semifinals =====
Team 1	Agg.	Team 2	1st leg	2nd leg
Unión Juventud Llacuabamba	1–1 (4–2 p)	Sporting Huamachuco	0–1	1–0
Independiente de Gala	2–4	Deportivo Municipal (Pataz)	1–1	1–3

===== Final =====
Team 1	Score	Team 2
Deportivo Municipal (Pataz)	4–0	Unión Juventud Llacuabamba

=== Liguilla Final ===
Pos	Team	Pld	W	D	L	GF	GA	GD	Pts	Qualification or relegation	RIV	JBE	INC	MUN
1	Sport River	6	3	2	1	9	5	+4	11	Advance to 2025 Copa Perú		1–0	2–2	3–1
2	Juventud Bellavista	6	3	2	1	8	5	+3	11	Advance to 2025 Copa Perú	2–1		1–1	3–1
3	El Inca	6	1	3	2	7	8	−1	6	Advance to 2025 Copa Perú	0–0	0–1		3–2
4	Deportivo Municipal (Pataz)	6	1	1	4	7	13	−6	4		0–2	1–1	2–1	

Legend: Blue = home team win; Yellow = draw; Red = away team win.
Rules for classification: 1) Points; 2) Goal difference; 3) Goals for; 4) Fair play points; 5) Drawing of lots.

==== Tiebreaker ====
Team 1	Score	Team 2
Sport River	4–1	Juventud Bellavista

== Liga Departamental de Lambayeque ==
=== Group Stage ===
==== Group A ====
Pos	Team	Pld	W	D	L	GF	GA	GD	Pts	CAC	AME	DEF	MER
1	Cachorro	3	3	0	0	9	2	+7	9			2–1	
2	América de Tepo	3	2	0	1	7	1	+6	6	0–1			3–0
3	Defensor Esperanza	3	1	0	2	4	8	−4	3		0–4		2–3
4	Las Mercedes	3	1	0	2	4	11	−7	3	1–6			

Legend: Blue = home team win; Yellow = draw; Red = away team win.
Rules for classification: 1) Points; 2) Goal difference; 3) Goals for; 4) Fair play points; 5) Drawing of lots.

==== Group B ====
Pos	Team	Pld	W	D	L	GF	GA	GD	Pts	VAS	BOL	SMA	JSA
1	Vasco da Gama	3	2	1	0	6	2	+4	7			3–1	2–0
2	Deportivo Bolognesi	3	1	2	0	3	2	+1	5	1–1			1–0
3	Deportivo San Martín	3	0	2	1	2	4	−2	2		1–1		
4	Juventud San Alberto	3	0	1	2	0	3	−3	1			0–0	

Legend: Blue = home team win; Yellow = draw; Red = away team win.
Rules for classification: 1) Points; 2) Goal difference; 3) Goals for; 4) Fair play points; 5) Drawing of lots.

==== Group C ====
Pos	Team	Pld	W	D	L	GF	GA	GD	Pts	CAS	ZEL	OLM	JBA
1	Castaños	3	2	1	0	5	2	+3	7		2–0	2–2	
2	Zelada	3	2	0	1	4	2	+2	6			1–0	3–0
3	Olmos	3	1	1	1	6	3	+3	4				4–0
4	José Balta	3	0	0	3	0	8	−8	0	0–1			

Legend: Blue = home team win; Yellow = draw; Red = away team win.
Rules for classification: 1) Points; 2) Goal difference; 3) Goals for; 4) Fair play points; 5) Drawing of lots.

==== Group D ====
Pos	Team	Pld	W	D	L	GF	GA	GD	Pts	TUM	SLO	CRU	AUR
1	Deportivo Tumi	3	3	0	0	8	3	+5	9		3–1		
2	San Lorenzo	3	2	0	1	5	4	+1	6				3–1
3	Cruz de Chalpón	3	1	0	2	2	3	−1	3	1–2	0–1		
4	Juan Aurich Pastor	3	0	0	3	2	7	−5	0	1–3		0–1	

Legend: Blue = home team win; Yellow = draw; Red = away team win.
Rules for classification: 1) Points; 2) Goal difference; 3) Goals for; 4) Fair play points; 5) Drawing of lots.

==== Group E ====
Pos	Team	Pld	W	D	L	GF	GA	GD	Pts	PER	JLJ	MGP	BOL
1	Peroles Las Vegas	3	1	2	0	4	1	+3	5			3–0	1–1
2	Juventud La Joya	3	1	2	0	2	1	+1	5	0–0			
3	Manuel Gonzáles Prada	3	1	1	1	4	6	−2	4		1–1		3–2
4	Defensor Bolognesi	3	0	1	2	3	5	−2	1		0–1		

Legend: Blue = home team win; Yellow = draw; Red = away team win.
Rules for classification: 1) Points; 2) Goal difference; 3) Goals for; 4) Fair play points; 5) Drawing of lots.

=== Second Stage ===
Team 1	Agg.	Team 2	1st leg	2nd leg
Juventud La Joya	5–4 (4–5 p)	Cachorro	1–3	4–1
San Lorenzo	3–6	Vasco da Gama	2–2	1–4
Olmos	3–2	Deportivo Bolognesi	2–2	1–0
Zelada Jr.	1–4	Peroles Las Vegas	0–2	1–2
Manuel Gonzáles Prada	0–4	Deportivo Tumi	0–2	0–2
América de Tepo	5–3	Castaños	2–2	3–1

=== Quarterfinals ===
Team 1	Agg.	Team 2	1st leg	2nd leg
Juventud La Joya	1–3	Cachorro	1–2	0–1
Vasco da Gama	1–3	Peroles Las Vegas	0–2	1–1
Deportivo Bolognesi	1–4	América de Tepo	0–1	1–3
Olmos	0–3	Deportivo Tumi	0–2	0–1

=== Semifinals ===
Team 1	Agg.	Team 2	1st leg	2nd leg
Peroles Las Vegas	0–3	Deportivo Tumi	0–3	0–0
América de Tepo	2–3	Cachorro	2–2	0–1

=== Third Place ===
Team 1	Score	Team 2
América de Tepo	1–1 (4–3 p)	Peroles Las Vegas

=== Final ===
Team 1	Score	Team 2
Deportivo Tumi	2–1	Cachorro

== Liga Departamental de Lima ==
=== First Stage ===
Team 1	Agg.	Team 2	1st leg	2nd leg
Real Independiente	1–4	Bella Esperanza	1–2	0–2
Vasco da Gama	4–5	Unión Sport Morales	2–1	2–4
Independiente Cerro Blanco	1–0	Juniors de América	1–0	0–0
Defensor Lubricantes	2–3	Deportivo Oyotún	2–1	0–2
San Antonio	4–7	Juventud Huracán	1–0	3–7
Deportivo San Luis	1–2	ASA	0–0	1–2
Sport Santos	0–5	Sport Andahuasi	0–2	0–3
Unión Supe	3–2	Independiente	3–1	0–1
Deportivo Palpa	6–1	Estudiantil Sangrar	4–1	2–0
Sport Humaya	3–1	Sol de Vitarte	2–0	1–1
Real Huarcos	3–1	DIM Huarochirí	2–0	1–1

=== Round of 16 ===
Team 1	Agg.	Team 2	1st leg	2nd leg
Sport Morales	1–6	Juventud Huracán	1–4	0–2
Deportivo Oyotún	2–10	ASA	1–4	1–6
San Antonio	1–4	Sport Andahuasi	1–3	0–1
Vasco da Gama	1–2	Sport Huamaya	1–1	0–1
Independiente	1–1 (4–5 p)	Bella Esperanza	1–0	0–1
Defensor Lubricantes	3–3 (1–2 p)	Real Huarcos	2–2	1–1
Deportivo San Luis	2–2 (3–1 p)	Deportivo Palpa	1–1	1–1
Unión Supe	1–1 (2–4 p)	Independiente Cerro Blanco	1–0	0–1

=== Quarterfinals ===
Team 1	Agg.	Team 2	1st leg	2nd leg
Juventud Huracán	2–2 (4–2 p)	Deportivo San Luis	2–1	0–1
ASA	3–2	Bella Esperanza	1–0	2–2
Independiente Cerro Blanco	1–2	Sport Andahuasi	1–1	0–1
Sport Humaya	1–2	Real Huarcos	1–1	0–1

=== Semifinals ===
Team 1	Agg.	Team 2	1st leg	2nd leg
Real Huarcos	3–2	Sport Andahuasi	2–1	1–1
ASA	6–1	Juventud Huracán	2–0	4–1

=== Third Place ===
Team 1	Score	Team 2
Juventud Huracán	2–1	Sport Andahuasi

=== Final ===
Team 1	Score	Team 2
ASA	1–2	Real Huarcos

== Liga Departamental de Loreto ==
=== Group Stage ===
==== Group A ====
Pos	Team	Pld	W	D	L	GF	GA	GD	Pts	UGE	MUN	SJO
1	UGEELA	2	1	1	0	3	2	+1	4			2–1
2	Deportivo Municipal (Nauta)	2	1	1	0	6	2	+4	4	1–1		
3	San José	2	0	0	2	2	7	−5	0		1–5	

Legend: Blue = home team win; Yellow = draw; Red = away team win.
Rules for classification: 1) Points; 2) Goal difference; 3) Goals for; 4) Fair play points; 5) Drawing of lots.

===== Tiebreaker =====
Team 1	Score	Team 2
UGEELA	1–0	Deportivo Municipal (Nauta)

==== Group B ====
Pos	Team	Pld	W	D	L	GF	GA	GD	Pts	DEF	REN	UNI
1	Defensor Balsapuerto	2	2	0	0	8	2	+6	6			5–1
2	Renacer Tecnológico	1	0	0	1	1	3	−2	0	1–3		
3	Unión Jerusalén	1	0	0	1	1	5	−4	0		W.O.	

Legend: Blue = home team win; Yellow = draw; Red = away team win.
Rules for classification: 1) Points; 2) Goal difference; 3) Goals for; 4) Fair play points; 5) Drawing of lots.

==== Group C ====
Pos	Team	Pld	W	D	L	GF	GA	GD	Pts	NIH	GAM	GEN
1	Nihue Rao	2	2	0	0	7	0	+7	6		3–0	
2	AFC Gambeta	2	1	0	1	2	4	−2	3			2–1
3	Genaro Herrera	2	0	0	2	1	6	−5	0	0–4		

Legend: Blue = home team win; Yellow = draw; Red = away team win.
Rules for classification: 1) Points; 2) Goal difference; 3) Goals for; 4) Fair play points; 5) Drawing of lots.

==== Group D ====
Pos	Team	Pld	W	D	L	GF	GA	GD	Pts	SHI	MER	SHE
1	Shirmar	2	2	0	0	4	1	+3	6			2–0
2	MERV	2	1	0	1	13	3	+10	3	1–2		
3	Atlético Shebonal	2	0	0	2	1	14	−13	0		1–12	

Legend: Blue = home team win; Yellow = draw; Red = away team win.
Rules for classification: 1) Points; 2) Goal difference; 3) Goals for; 4) Fair play points; 5) Drawing of lots.

=== Final Stage ===
Pos	Team	Pld	W	D	L	GF	GA	GD	Pts	Qualification or relegation	NIH	BAL	SHI	UGE
1	Nihue Rao	3	3	0	0	6	1	+5	9	Advance to 2025 Copa Perú		2–0	2–0	
2	Defensor Balsapuerto	3	2	0	1	8	2	+6	6	Advance to 2025 Copa Perú			5–0	3–0
3	Shimar	3	1	0	2	1	7	−6	3					1–0
4	UGEELA	3	0	0	3	1	6	−5	0		1–2			

Legend: Blue = home team win; Yellow = draw; Red = away team win.
Rules for classification: 1) Points; 2) Goal difference; 3) Goals for; 4) Fair play points; 5) Drawing of lots.

== Liga Departamental de Madre de Dios ==
=== Semifinals ===
Team 1	Agg.	Team 2	1st leg	2nd leg
ADEVIL	2–4	La Masía Nace	1–3	1–1
Atlético Junior	3–7 (2–4 p)	Colegio Nacional Billingurst	1–0	2–7

=== Final ===
Team 1	Agg.	Team 2	1st leg	2nd leg
Colegio Nacional Billingurst	3–5	La Masía Nace	1–1	2–4

== Liga Departamental de Moquegua ==
=== Standings ===
Pos	Team	Pld	W	D	L	GF	GA	GD	Pts	Qualification or relegation	HIJ	BAR	UCV	ADE
1	Hijos del Altiplano y del Pacífico	6	4	1	1	17	6	+11	13	Advance to 2025 Copa Perú		5–3	1–0	4–0
2	Barrio 12	6	3	2	1	16	8	+8	11	Advance to 2025 Copa Perú	0–0		1–1	4–0
3	UCV Moquegua	6	1	2	3	6	11	−5	5		3–2	0–4		2–2
4	ADEBA	6	1	1	4	5	19	−14	4		0–5	2–4	1–0	

Legend: Blue = home team win; Yellow = draw; Red = away team win.
Rules for classification: 1) Points; 2) Goal difference; 3) Goals for; 4) Fair play points; 5) Drawing of lots.

== Liga Departamental de Pasco ==
=== Group Stage ===
==== Group A ====
Pos	Team	Pld	W	D	L	GF	GA	GD	Pts	Qualification or relegation	UNI	TIR	MUN	UDY
1	Unión Minas	6	6	0	0	32	4	+28	18	Advance to 2025 Copa Perú		3–1	2–1	7–0
2	Sociedad Tiro 28	6	4	0	2	18	6	+12	12		1–2		2–0	5–0
3	Deportivo Municipal (Oxapampa)	6	2	0	4	10	15	−5	6		1–4	1–3		3–2
4	UDY	6	0	0	6	4	39	−35	0		0–14	0–6	2–4	

Legend: Blue = home team win; Yellow = draw; Red = away team win.
Rules for classification: 1) Points; 2) Goal difference; 3) Goals for; 4) Fair play points; 5) Drawing of lots.

==== Group B ====
Pos	Team	Pld	W	D	L	GF	GA	GD	Pts	Qualification or relegation	MUN	PEÑ	TEC	MAR
1	Deportivo Municipal (Palcazú)	6	4	1	1	22	8	+14	13	Advance to 2025 Copa Perú		9–0	3–2	4–1
2	Peñarol (Huarautambo)	5	4	0	1	11	14	−3	12		3–1		1–0	3–2
3	Tecnomin	6	2	1	3	19	11	+8	7		1–1	2–4		12–1
4	Mariscal Castilla	5	0	0	5	6	25	−19	0		1–4	—	1–2	

Legend: Blue = home team win; Yellow = draw; Red = away team win.
Rules for classification: 1) Points; 2) Goal difference; 3) Goals for; 4) Fair play points; 5) Drawing of lots.

=== Final ===
Team 1	Score	Team 2
Unión Minas	11–0	Deportivo Municipal (Palcazú)

== Liga Departamental de Piura ==
=== Group Stage ===
==== Group A ====
Pos	Team	Pld	W	D	L	GF	GA	GD	Pts	UDP	RAC	EST
1	UD Parachique	4	2	1	1	7	6	+1	7		2–1	1–1
2	Racing (Tambogrande)	4	2	0	2	4	4	0	6	1–2		1–0
3	Estudiantes de La Matanza	4	1	1	2	4	5	−1	4	3–2	0–1	

Legend: Blue = home team win; Yellow = draw; Red = away team win.
Rules for classification: 1) Points; 2) Goal difference; 3) Goals for; 4) Fair play points; 5) Drawing of lots.

==== Group B ====
Pos	Team	Pld	W	D	L	GF	GA	GD	Pts	DEF	CRI	RPA
1	Defensor Belis	4	4	0	0	6	1	+5	12		2–1	2–0
2	Academia Cristo Rey	4	2	0	2	6	4	+2	6	0–1		2–1
3	Real Pavletich	4	0	0	4	1	8	−7	0	0–1	0–3	

Legend: Blue = home team win; Yellow = draw; Red = away team win.
Rules for classification: 1) Points; 2) Goal difference; 3) Goals for; 4) Fair play points; 5) Drawing of lots.

==== Group C ====
Pos	Team	Pld	W	D	L	GF	GA	GD	Pts	JIB	LIB	MAR
1	Jibaja Che	4	3	0	1	8	6	+2	9		3–0	1–0
2	Sport Liberal	4	2	0	2	7	8	−1	6	5–0		1–0
3	Sport Marítimo	4	1	0	3	6	7	−1	3	1–4	5–1	

Legend: Blue = home team win; Yellow = draw; Red = away team win.
Rules for classification: 1) Points; 2) Goal difference; 3) Goals for; 4) Fair play points; 5) Drawing of lots.

==== Group D ====
Pos	Team	Pld	W	D	L	GF	GA	GD	Pts	UGA	OLI	EST
1	Alfonso Ugarte	4	3	0	1	6	5	+1	9		1–0	2–0
2	Olimpia	4	2	1	1	9	5	+4	7	5–2		3–1
3	Estudiantes de Pueblo Nuevo	4	0	1	3	2	7	−5	1	0–1	1–1	

Legend: Blue = home team win; Yellow = draw; Red = away team win.
Rules for classification: 1) Points; 2) Goal difference; 3) Goals for; 4) Fair play points; 5) Drawing of lots.

==== Group E ====
Pos	Team	Pld	W	D	L	GF	GA	GD	Pts	STU	AUR	COR
1	Estudiantes de Chancay	4	3	0	1	10	4	+6	9		1–0	5–2
2	Juan Aurich (Morropón)	4	1	0	3	7	8	−1	3	0–3		6–1
3	Puro Corazón	4	2	0	2	8	12	−4	6	2–1	3–1	

Legend: Blue = home team win; Yellow = draw; Red = away team win.
Rules for classification: 1) Points; 2) Goal difference; 3) Goals for; 4) Fair play points; 5) Drawing of lots.

==== Group F ====
Pos	Team	Pld	W	D	L	GF	GA	GD	Pts	TOR	JCM	3DM
1	Atlético Torino	4	4	0	0	13	2	+11	12		4–0	4–0
2	José Carlos Mariátegui	4	1	1	2	4	8	−4	4	1–2		2–2
3	3 de Mayo (Pulun)	4	0	1	3	3	10	−7	1	1–3	0–1	

Legend: Blue = home team win; Yellow = draw; Red = away team win.
Rules for classification: 1) Points; 2) Goal difference; 3) Goals for; 4) Fair play points; 5) Drawing of lots.

==== Group G ====
Pos	Team	Pld	W	D	L	GF	GA	GD	Pts	CAS	5DF	SMI
1	Las Casuarinas	4	2	1	1	7	4	+3	7		2–0	2–0
2	5 de Febrero	4	2	0	2	4	5	−1	6	2–1		2–1
3	San Miguel	4	1	1	2	4	6	−2	4	2–2	1–0	

Legend: Blue = home team win; Yellow = draw; Red = away team win.
Rules for classification: 1) Points; 2) Goal difference; 3) Goals for; 4) Fair play points; 5) Drawing of lots.

=== Second Stage ===
Team 1	Agg.	Team 2	1st leg	2nd leg
UD Parachique	4–0	5 de Febrero	1–0	W.O.
Defensor Belis	3–4	Sport Liberal	1–3	2–1
Jibaja Che	4–7	Racing (Tambogrande)	1–6	3–1
Olimpia	6–3	Academia Cristo Rey	5–0	1–3
Estudiantes de Chancay	10–3	Las Casuarinas	3–0	7–3
Alfonso Ugarte	0–5	Atlético Torino	0–2	0–3

=== Third Stage ===
==== Group A ====
Pos	Team	Pld	W	D	L	GF	GA	GD	Pts	Qualification or relegation	DEF	JIB	UDP	OLI
1	Defensor Belis	6	4	0	2	16	9	+7	12			1–2	4–1	3–0
2	Jibaja Che	6	4	0	2	10	9	+1	12	Advance to 2025 Copa Perú	2–1		1–4	2–0
3	UD Parachique	6	3	1	2	14	9	+5	10		3–4	3–0		0–0
4	Olimpia	6	0	1	5	1	14	−13	1		1–3	0–3	0–3	

Legend: Blue = home team win; Yellow = draw; Red = away team win.
Rules for classification: 1) Points; 2) Goal difference; 3) Goals for; 4) Fair play points; 5) Drawing of lots.

===== Tiebreaker =====
Team 1	Score	Team 2
Jibaja Che	1–0	Defensor Belis

==== Group B ====
Pos	Team	Pld	W	D	L	GF	GA	GD	Pts	Qualification or relegation	TOR	EST	LIB	RAC
1	Atlético Torino	6	4	2	0	10	2	+8	14	Advance to 2025 Copa Perú		1–0	4–0	2–0
2	Estudiantes de Chancay	6	3	1	2	8	3	+5	10		0–0		2–0	3–1
3	Sport Liberal	6	2	1	3	5	12	−7	7		2–2	0–3		2–1
4	Racing de Tambogrande	6	1	0	5	3	9	−6	3		0–1	1–0	0–1	

Legend: Blue = home team win; Yellow = draw; Red = away team win.
Rules for classification: 1) Points; 2) Goal difference; 3) Goals for; 4) Fair play points; 5) Drawing of lots.

=== Third Place ===
Team 1	Score	Team 2
Defensor Belis	0–3	Estudiantes de Chancay

=== Final ===
Team 1	Score	Team 2
Atlético Torino	2–0	Jibaja Che

== Liga Departamental de Puno ==
=== Group Stage ===
==== Group A ====
Pos	Team	Pld	W	D	L	GF	GA	GD	Pts	FYA	UGA	CRI	POL
1	Fe y Alegría 27	6	5	1	0	12	2	+10	16		1–1	2–1	3–0
2	Atlético Alfonso Ugarte	6	3	1	2	9	5	+4	10	0–2		2–0	4–0
3	Cristo Rey Quilcapunco	6	2	0	4	5	7	−2	6	0–1	2–0		1–0
4	Politécnico Industrial	6	1	0	5	2	14	−12	3	0–3	0–2	2–1	

Updated to match(es) played on unknown. Source:
Legend: Blue = home team win; Yellow = draw; Red = away team win.
Rules for classification: 1) Points; 2) Goal difference; 3) Goals for; 4) Fair play points; 5) Drawing of lots.

==== Group B ====
Pos	Team	Pld	W	D	L	GF	GA	GD	Pts	ANB	LIB	UGA	SAN
1	ANBA Perú	6	5	0	1	18	5	+13	15		2–1	5–0	5–0
2	Libertador Simón Bolívar	6	3	0	3	7	7	0	9	0–2		2–0	2–1
3	Alfonso Ugarte (Huamanruro)	6	3	0	3	6	10	−4	9	3–1	0–1		1–0
4	Santiago Giraldo	6	1	0	5	5	14	−9	3	1–3	2–1	1–2	

Updated to match(es) played on unknown. Source:
Legend: Blue = home team win; Yellow = draw; Red = away team win.
Rules for classification: 1) Points; 2) Goal difference; 3) Goals for; 4) Fair play points; 5) Drawing of lots.

===== Tiebreaker =====
Team 1	Score	Team 2
Alfonso Ugarte (Huamanruro)	1–0	Libertador Simón Bolivar

==== Group C ====
Pos	Team	Pld	W	D	L	GF	GA	GD	Pts	ILL	MUN	PED	UNI
1	Illanes 48 Llallahua	6	5	1	0	16	2	+14	16		7–1	3–1	3–0
2	Deportivo Municipal (Sandia)	6	3	1	2	8	12	−4	10	0–2		2–1	2–1
3	Pedro Ruiz Gallo (Juli)	6	1	2	3	8	9	−1	5	0–1	1–1		3–0
4	Unión Puerto Manoa	6	0	2	4	3	12	−9	2	0–0	0–2	2–2	

Updated to match(es) played on unknown. Source:
Legend: Blue = home team win; Yellow = draw; Red = away team win.
Rules for classification: 1) Points; 2) Goal difference; 3) Goals for; 4) Fair play points; 5) Drawing of lots.

==== Group D ====
Pos	Team	Pld	W	D	L	GF	GA	GD	Pts	SMA	FUE	POL
1	San Martín Tours	4	4	0	0	9	2	+7	12		2–0	2–1
2	Fuerza Unión Palca	4	2	0	2	6	6	0	6	1–2		1–0
3	Policial Santa Rosa	4	0	0	4	3	10	−7	0	0–3	2–4	

Updated to match(es) played on unknown. Source:
Legend: Blue = home team win; Yellow = draw; Red = away team win.
Rules for classification: 1) Points; 2) Goal difference; 3) Goals for; 4) Fair play points; 5) Drawing of lots.

==== Group E ====
Pos	Team	Pld	W	D	L	GF	GA	GD	Pts	CRE	ANG	TAL
1	Credicoop San Román	4	3	0	1	12	2	+10	9		1–0	6–0
2	Unión Ángeles de Vizcachani	4	2	1	1	6	4	+2	7	2–1		3–1
3	Talentos Flores	4	0	1	3	2	14	−12	1	0–4	1–1	

Updated to match(es) played on unknown. Source:
Legend: Blue = home team win; Yellow = draw; Red = away team win.
Rules for classification: 1) Points; 2) Goal difference; 3) Goals for; 4) Fair play points; 5) Drawing of lots.

=== Second Stage ===
==== Group A ====
Pos	Team	Pld	W	D	L	GF	GA	GD	Pts	ILL	SMA	FYA	UGA
1	Illanes 48 Llallahua	6	3	2	1	12	5	+7	11		3–0	1–1	3–0
2	San Martín Tours	6	3	2	1	14	9	+5	11	3–3		4–1	4–0
3	Fe y Alegría 27	6	2	2	2	7	8	−1	8	1–0	1–2		2–0
4	Alfonso Ugarte (Huamanruro)	6	0	2	4	2	13	−11	2	0–2	1–1	1–1	

Legend: Blue = home team win; Yellow = draw; Red = away team win.
Rules for classification: 1) Points; 2) Goal difference; 3) Goals for; 4) Fair play points; 5) Drawing of lots.

==== Group B ====
Pos	Team	Pld	W	D	L	GF	GA	GD	Pts	ANB	SRO	UGA	MUN
1	ANBA Perú	6	5	1	0	18	4	+14	16		0–0	5–3	5–0
2	Credicoop San Román	6	2	3	1	10	2	+8	9	1–2		0–0	5–0
3	Atlético Alfonso Ugarte	6	2	1	3	9	13	−4	7	0–2	0–4		2–1
4	Deportivo Municipal (Sandía)	6	0	1	5	2	20	−18	1	0–4	0–0	1–4	

Legend: Blue = home team win; Yellow = draw; Red = away team win.
Rules for classification: 1) Points; 2) Goal difference; 3) Goals for; 4) Fair play points; 5) Drawing of lots.

=== Semifinals ===
Team 1	Agg.	Team 2	1st leg	2nd leg
Credicoop San Román	1–3	San Martín Tours	1–1	0–2
Illanes 48 Llallahua	1–4	ANBA Perú	1–2	0–2

=== Third Place ===
Team 1	Score	Team 2
Illanes 48 Llallahua	2–1	Credicoop San Román

=== Final ===
Team 1	Score	Team 2
ANBA Perú	1–0	San Martín Tours

== Liga Departamental de San Martín ==
=== First Stage ===
==== Zona Norte ====
Team 1	Agg.	Team 2	1st leg	2nd leg
Santa Fe	5–4	Shanao	2–2	3–2
Kechwas Lamistas	2–3	ADT Tahuishco	1–1	1–2
Unión Moyobamba	2–1	Juvenil Naranjos	1–0	1–1

==== Zona Centro ====
Team 1	Agg.	Team 2	1st leg	2nd leg
Real Sociedad	2–1	Alianza Tres Unidos	2–1	0–0
Defensor Todos Unidos	2–3	Grandez FC	2–2	0–1
Juventud Católica	3–3	Real Ishichihui	1–2	2–1

==== Zona Sur ====
Team 1	Agg.	Team 2	1st leg	2nd leg
Defensor La Merced	0–1	Oriental Sporting	0–1	0–0
Biavo	3–4	Defensor Víveres	1–1	2–3
Lukita	1–1	Huallaga Ledoy	0–0	1–1

=== Round of 16 ===
Team 1	Agg.	Team 2	1st leg	2nd leg
Unión Moyobamba	5–1	Huallaga Ledoy	4–0	1–1
Kechwas Lamistas	2–3	AD Tahuishco	1–1	1–2
Alianza Tres Unidos	7–4	Santa Fe	4–1	3–3
Biavo	1–5	Grandez	1–1	0–4
Shanao	1–1 (3–5 p)	Real Sociedad	1–0	0–1
Juventud Católica	3–5	Real Ishichichui	3–2	0–3
Lukita	1–2	Oriental Sporting	1–0	0–2
Defensor Tres Unidos	3–5	Defensor Víveres	2–0	1–5

=== Quarterfinals ===
Team 1	Agg.	Team 2	1st leg	2nd leg
Unión Moyobamba	2–4	Defensor Víveres	2–1	0–3
Real Ishichichui	3–7	Grandez	2–2	1–5
Oriental Sporting	2–3	AD Tahuishco	1–1	1–2
Alianza Tres Unidos	4–0	Real Sociedad	4–0	0–0

=== Semifinals ===
Team 1	Agg.	Team 2	1st leg	2nd leg
Grandez	6–1	Defensor Víveres	2–0	4–1
Alianza Tres Unidos	2–1	AD Tahuishco	0–0	2–1

=== Third Place ===
Team 1	Score	Team 2
AD Tahuishco	5–1	Defensor Víveres

=== Final ===
Team 1	Score	Team 2
Grandez	2–1	Alianza Tres Unidos

== Liga Departamental de Tacna ==
=== First stage ===
Team 1	Agg.	Team 2	1st leg	2nd leg
Sport Tarata	2–4	Sporting Centauro	2–2	0–2
Deportivo Municipal	1–5	Real Sociedad	0–4	1–1
San Agustín de Huanuara	4–5	Unión Challaguaya	1–3	3–2
Orcas AVT	0–3	Dínamo de Solabaya	0–1	0–2

=== Secong stage ===
Team 1	Agg.	Team 2	1st leg	2nd leg
Sport Tarata	1–5	Dínamo de Solabaya	1–2	0–3
Sporting Centauro	6–4	Unión Challaguaya	0–1	6–3
Real Sociedad	18–1	San Agustín de Huanuara	6–1	12–0

=== Liguilla Final ===
Pos	Team	Pld	W	D	L	GF	GA	GD	Pts	Qualification or relegation	REA	DIN	UNI	CEN
1	Real Sociedad	3	3	0	0	8	3	+5	9	Advance to 2025 Copa Perú		2–0	4–2	
2	Dínamo de Solabaya	3	1	1	1	4	4	0	4	Advance to 2025 Copa Perú			1–1	3–1
3	Unión Challaguaya	3	1	1	1	7	5	+2	4					4–0
4	Sporting Centauro	3	0	0	3	2	9	−7	0		1–2			

Updated to match(es) played on unknown. Source:
Legend: Blue = home team win; Yellow = draw; Red = away team win.
Rules for classification: 1) Points; 2) Goal difference; 3) Goals for; 4) Fair play points; 5) Drawing of lots.

==== Tiebreaker ====
Team 1	Score	Team 2
Dínamo de Solabaya	3–1	Unión Challaguaya

== Liga Departamental de Tumbes ==
=== Standings ===
Pos	Team	Pld	W	D	L	GF	GA	GD	Pts	Qualification or relegation	IND	UNT	PAM	ZAR	BAR	CHU
1	Independiente Zorritos	5	3	2	0	8	2	+6	11	Advance to 2025 Copa Perú		1–1		2–1		
2	UNT	5	3	2	0	7	4	+3	11	Advance to 2025 Copa Perú			2–2	1–0	2–1	
3	Sport Pampas	5	2	2	1	13	9	+4	8		0–0				3–2	
4	Sport Zarumilla	5	2	1	2	10	7	+3	7				2–1		3–3	4–0
5	Barcelona (Acapulco)	5	0	2	3	7	10	−3	2		0–1					1–1
6	UD Chulucanas	5	0	1	4	4	17	−13	1		0–4	0–1	3–7			

Legend: Blue = home team win; Yellow = draw; Red = away team win.
Rules for classification: 1) Points; 2) Goal difference; 3) Goals for; 4) Fair play points; 5) Drawing of lots.

==== Tiebreaker ====
Team 1	Score	Team 2
UNT	3–2	Independiente Zorritos

== Liga Departamental de Ucayali ==
=== First Stage ===
Team 1	Agg.	Team 2	1st leg	2nd leg
Nuevo San Juan	W.O.	Deportivo Municipal (Sepahua)	W.O.	W.O.
Valle del Shambillo	1–1 (4–2 p)	Lanceros Verdes	1–1	0–0
Los Ángeles de Honoria	2–3	Colegio Comercio	0–1	2–2
Atlético Nacional	6–3	Estudiantil Bolognesi	3–2	3–1

=== Liguilla Final ===
Pos	Team	Pld	W	D	L	GF	GA	GD	Pts	Qualification or relegation	COL	NAC	NUE	VAL
1	Colegio Comercio	3	2	1	0	9	3	+6	7	Advance to 2025 Copa Perú		3–3		
2	Atlético Nacional	3	1	2	0	6	5	+1	5	Advance to 2025 Copa Perú			1–1	
3	Nuevo San Juan	3	0	2	1	3	5	−2	2		0–2			
4	Valle de Shambillo	3	0	1	2	3	8	−5	1		0–4	1–2	2–2	

Updated to match(es) played on unknown. Source:
Legend: Blue = home team win; Yellow = draw; Red = away team win.
Rules for classification: 1) Points; 2) Goal difference; 3) Goals for; 4) Fair play points; 5) Drawing of lots.

== See also ==
- 2025 Liga 1
- 2025 Liga 2
- 2025 Liga 3
- 2025 Copa Perú
