= Unión Alfonso Ugarte =

Peruvian football club

- Full name: Club Social Deportivo Unión Alfonso Ugarte
- Founded: 2003
- Ground: Jorge Basadre, Tacna
- Capacity: 19,850
- League: Copa Perú

== History ==
In the 2009 Copa Perú, the club qualified to the National Stage but was eliminated by Diablos Rojos of Puno in the quarterfinals.

== Coach ==
- (Peru) Héctor Berrío Vega (2009-2010)

== Honours ==
=== National ===
- Región VII:

Runner-up (1): 2009

- Liga Departamental de Tacna:

Winners (2): 2010, 2018
Runner-up (1): 2009

== See also ==
- List of football clubs in Peru
- Peruvian football league system
