= Consejo de Deportes de la Universidad Nacional de la Amazonía Peruana =

UNAP
- Full name: Consejo de Deportes de la Universidad Nacional de la Amazonía Peruana
- Ground: Max Augustin, Iquitos
- Capacity: 25,000
- League: Copa Perú
Home colours	Away colours

Consejo de Deportes de la Universidad Nacional de la Amazonía Peruana (sometimes referred as UNAP) is a Peruvian football club, playing in the city of Iquitos, Loreto, Peru.

== History ==
In 2000 Copa Perú, the club qualified to the Regional Stage, but was eliminated by San Juan and Power Maíz in the Group Stage.

In 2003 Copa Perú, the club qualified to the National Stage, but was eliminated by Abraham Valdelomar in the Quarterfinals.

In 2004 Copa Perú, the club qualified to the National Stage, but was eliminated by Deportivo Municipal in the Round of 16.

In 2005 Copa Perú, the club qualified to the Regional Stage, but was eliminated by CNI in the Group Stage.

In 2007 Copa Perú, the club qualified to the Regional Stage, but was eliminated by Deportivo Hospital and UNU in the Group Stage.

In 2009 Copa Perú, the club qualified to the National Stage, but was eliminated by DIM in the Round of 16.

In 2010 Copa Perú, the club qualified to the Regional Stage, but was eliminated by Atlético Pucallpa and Deportivo Hospital in the Group Stage.

In 2012 Copa Perú, the club qualified to the Regional Stage, but was eliminated by Alianza Cristiana in the Group Stage.

== Honours ==
=== Regional ===
- Región III:

Winners (1): 2003
Runner-up (1): 2009

- Región IV:

Runner-up (1): 2005

- Región V:

Winners (1): 2004

- Liga Departamental de Loreto:

Winners (5): 2000, 2003, 2004, 2007, 2009
Runner-up (4): 2005, 2010, 2012, 2026

- Liga Provincial de Maynas:

Winners (3): 2000, 2003, 2012
Runner-up (4): 2007, 2009, 2018, 2024

- Liga Distrital de Iquitos:

Winners (6): 2000, 2003, 2007, 2011, 2022, 2024
Runner-up (4): 2009, 2012, 2018, 2026

== See also ==
- List of football clubs in Peru
- Peruvian football league system
