= Pomacocha District =

Pomacocha District may refer to:

- Pomacocha District, Acobamba
- Pomacocha District, Andahuaylas
