= Rosario District =

Rosario District may refer to:

- Peru:
  - Rosario District, Acobamba, in Acobamba province, Huancavelica region
- Costa Rica
  - Rosario District, Desamparados, in Desamparados (canton), San José province
  - El Rosario District, in Naranjo (canton), Alajuela province

== See also ==
- Rosario (disambiguation)
