= Wilger Saboya =

Peruvian footballer (born 1988)

Personal information
- Full name: Wilger Elías Saboya Shuña
- Date of birth: 21 December 1988 (age 37)
- Place of birth: Pucallpa, Peru
- Height: 1.63 m (5 ft 4 in)
- Position: Midfielder

Team information
- Current team: Brothers Union
- Number: 99

Senior career*
Years	Team	Apps	(Gls)
2009	Deportivo UNAP		
2010	Tecnológico	11	(1)
2011	UNU		
2012	San Alejandro		
2013	San CNI		
2014–2016	Sport Loreto	7	(0)
2018–	Brothers Union		
- * Club domestic league appearances and goals as of 18:11, 25 January 2019 (UTC)

Wilger Elías Saboya Shuña (born 21 December 1988) is a Peruvian footballer who plays as a midfielder for Bangladesh Premier League side Brothers Union.

== Career statistics ==
=== Club ===
As of 25 January 2019.

Club	Season	League			Cup		Other		Total	
Club	Season	Division	Apps	Goals	Apps	Goals	Apps	Goals	Apps	Goals
Tecnológico	2010	Peruvian Segunda División	11	1	0	0	0	0	11	1
Sport Loreto	2015	Peruvian Primera División	1	0	2 (Note: Appearances in the Torneo del Inca)	0	0	0	3	0
Sport Loreto	2016	Peruvian Segunda División	6	0	0	0	0	0	6	0
Career total			28	1	2	0	0	0	30	1
