= Deportivo Municipal (disambiguation) =

Deportivo Municipal usually refers to Deportivo Municipal, a Peruvian football team based in Lima.

It may also refer to:

- Deportivo Municipal de La Paz, a Bolivian football team
- Deportivo Municipal de Huamanga, a Peruvian football club
