= Huayanay =

Huayanay may refer to:

- Mount Huayanay, mountain in Peru
- Huayanay, Huancavelica, village in Anta District, Acobamba, Acobamba Province, Huancavelica Region, Peru
- Huayanay case, criminal case in the village of Huayanay, Huancavelica
- El caso de Huayanay, Peruvian movie
