= Andabamba District, Acobamba =

Coordinates: 12.6938°S 74.6238°W

Andabamba Antapampa
- District
- Interactive map of Andabamba
- Country: Peru
- Region: Huancavelica
- Province: Acobamba
- Founded: November 23, 1925
- Capital: Andabamba

Government
  - Mayor: Franklin Atauqui Ruiz

Area
  - Total: 81.85 km^{2} (31.60 sq mi)
- Elevation: 3,460 m (11,350 ft)

Population (2005 census)
  - Total: 4,082
  - Density: 49.87/km^{2} (129.2/sq mi)
- Time zone: UTC-5 (PET)
- UBIGEO: 090202

Andabamba District is one of eight districts of the province Acobamba in Peru.

== Ethnic groups ==
The people in the district are mainly Indigenous citizens of Quechua descent. Quechua is the language which the majority of the population (95.05%) learnt to speak in childhood, 4.56% of the residents started speaking using the Spanish language (2007 Peru Census).
