= Acobamba province =

Coordinates: 12°50′27″S 74°34′14″W

- Country: Peru
- Region: Huancavelica
- Seat: Acobamba

Government
  - Mayor: Rolando Vargas Mendoza

Area
  - Total: 910.82 km^{2} (351.67 sq mi)

Population
  - Total: 38,208
  - Density: 41.949/km^{2} (108.65/sq mi)
- Districts: 8
- UBIGEO: 0902
- Website: www.acobamba.hca.mp.gob.pe

Acobamba is the smallest of the seven provinces located in the department of Huancavelica in Peru. The capital of this province is the city of Acobamba.

== Boundaries ==
- North: province of Churcampa
- East: Ayacucho Region
- South: province of Angaraes
- West: province of Huancavelica

== Political division ==
The province is divided into eight districts, which are:

- Acobamba (Acobamba)
- Andabamba (Andabamba)
- Anta (Anta)
- Caja (Caja)
- Marcas (Marcas)
- Paucará (Paucará)
- Pomacocha (Pomacocha)
- Rosario (Rosario)

== Ethnic groups ==
The people in the province are mainly Indigenous citizens of Quechua descent. Quechua is the language which the majority of the population (85.93%) learnt to speak in childhood, 13.83% of the residents started speaking using the Spanish language (2007 Peru Census).

== See also ==
- Killa Mach'ay
