= Acobomba =

Acobamba Aqupampa
- Town
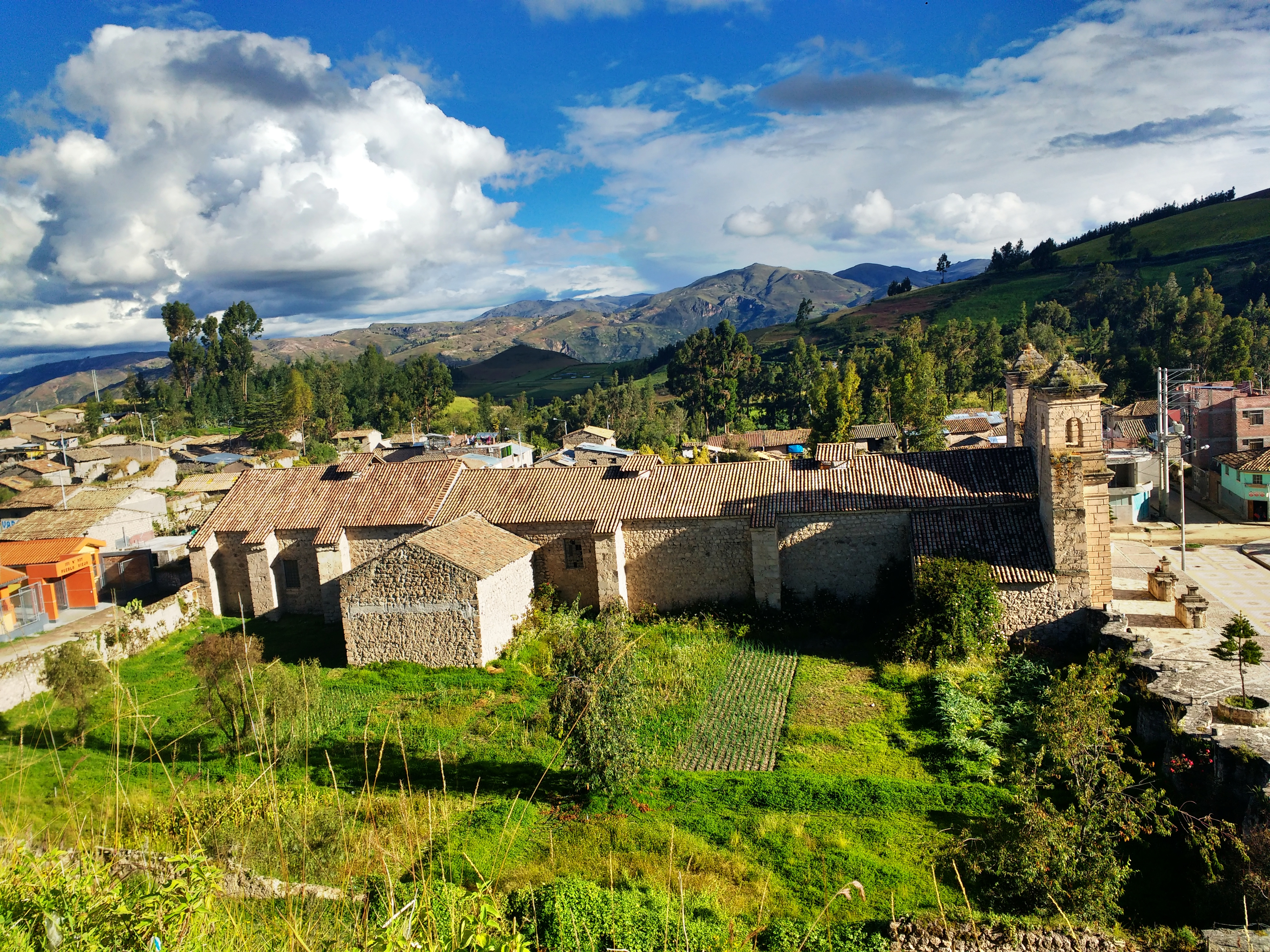
- Acobamba

- Location in Peru
- Coordinates: 12°50′35″S 74°34′10″W
- Country: Peru
- Region: Huancavelica
- Province: Acobamba
- District: Acobamba

Government
  - Mayor: Rolando Vargas Mendoza
- Elevation: 3,423 m (11,230 ft)

Population (2017)
  - Total: 8,980
- Time zone: UTC-5 (PET)
- Website: muniacobamba.gob.pe

Acobamba is a town in Peru. It is the capital of Acobamba district, in Acobamba Province of Department of Huancavelica.

According to the 2017 Peru Census, it has a population of 8,980.

== Climate ==
Climate data for Acobamba, elevation 3,399 m (11,152 ft), (1991–2020)
Month	Jan	Feb	Mar	Apr	May	Jun	Jul	Aug	Sep	Oct	Nov	Dec	Year
Mean daily maximum °C (°F)	18.4 (65.1)	18.1 (64.6)	18.1 (64.6)	18.6 (65.5)	19.1 (66.4)	18.7 (65.7)	18.6 (65.5)	19.2 (66.6)	19.5 (67.1)	20.2 (68.4)	20.8 (69.4)	19.4 (66.9)	19.1 (66.3)
Mean daily minimum °C (°F)	7.0 (44.6)	7.1 (44.8)	7.0 (44.6)	6.3 (43.3)	4.7 (40.5)	3.4 (38.1)	2.7 (36.9)	3.6 (38.5)	5.1 (41.2)	6.1 (43.0)	6.5 (43.7)	6.8 (44.2)	5.5 (41.9)
Average precipitation mm (inches)	120.1 (4.73)	127.2 (5.01)	94.5 (3.72)	39.2 (1.54)	19.4 (0.76)	8.1 (0.32)	10.2 (0.40)	17.0 (0.67)	22.9 (0.90)	51.4 (2.02)	48.6 (1.91)	101.9 (4.01)	660.5 (25.99)
Source: National Meteorology and Hydrology Service of Peru
