= Paucará District =

Coordinates: 12.7299°S 74.6662°W

Paucará Pawkara
- District
- Interactive map of Paucará
- Country: Peru
- Region: Huancavelica
- Province: Acobamba
- Founded: January 15, 1943
- Capital: Paucará

Government
  - Mayor: Patricio Huaman Paitan

Area
  - Total: 225.6 km^{2} (87.1 sq mi)
- Elevation: 3,806 m (12,487 ft)

Population (2005 census)
  - Total: 26,018
  - Density: 115.3/km^{2} (298.7/sq mi)
- Time zone: UTC-5 (PET)
- UBIGEO: 090206

Paucará District is one of eight districts of the Acobamba Province in Peru.

== Geography ==
One of the highest peaks of the district is Q'illu Saywa at approximately 4,400 m (14,400 ft). Other mountains are listed below:

- Ankapa Wachana
- Ichhu Saywa
- Kusuru
- Mach'ay Pata
- Q'ara Sinqa
- Waraqu Kancha
- Wik'uñayuq

== Ethnic groups ==
The people in the district are mainly Indigenous citizens of Quechua descent. Quechua is the language which the majority of the population (88.55%) learnt to speak in childhood, 11.31% of the residents started speaking using the Spanish language (2007 Peru Census).
