= Killa Mach'ay =

Archaeological site in Peru

- Interactive map of Killa Mach'ay
- Location: Peru
- Region: Huancavelica Region, Acobamba Province

Site notes
- Height: 3,400 metres (11,155 ft)

Killa Mach'ay (Quechua killa moon, mach'ay cave, "moon cave", also spelled Killa Machay, Killamachay, Quillamachay) is an archaeological site with rock paintings and petroglyphs in Peru. It is situated in the Huancavelica Region, Acobamba Province, Acobamba District. The site consists of caves with images of llamas, lines and people. It is situated at a height of 3,400 metres (11,155 ft).

== See also ==
- Inka Mach'ay
- Tampu Mach'ay
- Pirwayuq
