= Deportivo Independiente Miraflores =

DIM
- Full name: Club Deportivo Independiente Miraflores
- Nickname: DIM
- Founded: August 30, 1983
- Ground: Manuel Bonilla Stadium, Miraflores
- Capacity: 6,500
- League: Copa Perú
Home colours	Away colours

Club Deportivo Independiente Miraflores (sometimes referred as DIM) is a Peruvian football club, playing in the city of Miraflores, Lima, Peru.

== History ==
The Club Atlético Independiente was founded on August 30, 1983.

In the 2009 Copa Perú, the club qualified to the National Stage, but was eliminated by Tecnológico in the quarterfinals.

In the 2011 Copa Perú, the club qualified to the Departamental Stage, but was eliminated by Pacífico in the semifinals.

In the 2015 Copa Perú, the club qualified to the National Stage, but was eliminated by La Bocana in the quarterfinals.

In the 2016 Copa Perú, the club qualified to the National Stage, but was eliminated by Octavio Espinosa in the Repechage.

In the 2019 Copa Perú, the club qualified to the National Stage, but was eliminated by Deportivo Llacuabamba in the Round of 32.

In the 2021 Copa Perú, the club qualified to the National Stage, but was eliminated by Maristas in the Fase 1 - Regional.

In the 2022 Copa Perú, the club qualified to the Provincial Stage, but was eliminated in the group stage.

== Honours ==
=== Regional ===
- Región IV:

Winners (1): 2009

- Liga Departamental de Lima:

Winners (1): 2015
Runner-up (3): 2009, 2016, 2019

- Liga Provincial de Lima:

Winners (4): 2009, 2013, 2015, 2019
Runner-up (2): 2011, 2012

- Liga Distrital de Miraflores:

Winners (12): 2006, 2007, 2009, 2011, 2012, 2013, 2014, 2015, 2017, 2018, 2019, 2022
Runner-up (1): 2008

== See also ==
- List of football clubs in Peru
- Peruvian football league system
