= Caja District =

Coordinates: 12.9155°S 74.4662°W

Caja
- District
- Interactive map of Caja
- Country: Peru
- Region: Huancavelica
- Province: Acobamba
- Founded: January 2, 1857
- Capital: Caja

Government
  - Mayor: Eliceo Izarra Tovar

Area
  - Total: 82.39 km^{2} (31.81 sq mi)
- Elevation: 3,668 m (12,034 ft)

Population (2005 census)
  - Total: 3,009
  - Density: 36.52/km^{2} (94.59/sq mi)
- Time zone: UTC-5 (PET)
- UBIGEO: 090204

Caja District is one of eight districts of the province Acobamba in Peru.

== Ethnic groups ==
The people in the district are mainly Indigenous citizens of Quechua descent. Quechua is the language which the majority of the population (82.85%) learnt to speak in childhood, 16.58% of the residents started speaking using the Spanish language (2007 Peru Census).
