= 2009 Copa Perú =

Copa Perú
- Season: 2009
- Champions: León de Huánuco

The 2009 Copa Perú season (Spanish: Copa Perú 2009), the promotion tournament of Peruvian football, started on February.

The tournament has 5 stages. The first four stages are played as mini-league round-robin tournaments, except for third stage in region IV, which is played as a knockout stage. The final stage features two knockout rounds and a final four-team group stage to determine the two promoted teams.

The 2009 Peru Cup started with the District Stage (Spanish: Etapa Distrital) on February. The next stage was the Provincial Stage (Spanish: Etapa Provincial) which started, on June. The tournament continued with the Departamental Stage (Spanish: Etapa Departamental) on July. The Regional Staged followed. The National Stage (Spanish: Etapa Nacional) started on November. The winner and runner-up of the National Stage will be promoted to the First Division.

== Departmental Stage ==
Departmental Stage: Ligas Superiores del Peru 2009

The following list shows the teams that qualified for the Regional Stage.

Department	Team	Location
Amazonas	San Francisco de Asís (LG)	Utcubamba
Amazonas	Unión Santo Domingo	Chachapoyas
Ancash	Ramón Castilla	San Luis
Ancash	Juventud Culebreña	Huarmey
Apurímac	José María Arguedas	Andahuaylas
Apurímac	Deportivo Educación	Abancay
Arequipa	Unión Minas de Orcopampa	Orcopampa
Arequipa	Juventus Corazón	Majes
Ayacucho	Deportivo Municipal (Huamanga)	Ayacucho
Ayacucho	Froebel Deportes	Ayacucho
Cajamarca	Deportivo Municipal (San Ignacio)	Cajamarca
Cajamarca	Descendencia Michiquillay	Cajamarca
Cajamarca	UTC	Cajamarca
Callao	Atlético Centenario	Callao
Callao	Atlético Pilsen Callao	Callao
Cusco	Humberto Luna	Calca
Cusco	Deportivo Garcilaso	Cusco
Huancavelica	Diablos Rojos	Huancavelica
Huancavelica	Social Lircay	Angaraes
Huánuco	Alianza Universidad	Huánuco
Huánuco	León de Huánuco	Huánuco
Ica	Juventud Media Luna	Chincha
Ica	Olímpico Peruano	Ica
Junín	Unión Juventud Carhuacatac	Tarma
Junín	ADT	Tarma
La Libertad	Carlos A. Mannucci	Trujillo
La Libertad	Universitario de Trujillo	Trujillo

Department	Team	Location
Lambayeque	Universidad de Chiclayo	Chiclayo
Lambayeque	Dínamo	Chiclayo
Lima	Juventud La Rural	Surco
Lima	DIM	Miraflores
Loreto	UNAP	Iquitos
Loreto	San Francisco de Asís (Contamana)	Ucayali
Madre de Dios	MINSA	Tambopata
Madre de Dios	Juventud La Joya	Tambopata
Moquegua	Deportivo Enersur	Moquegua
Moquegua	San Lino de Omate	Sánchez Cerro
Pasco	Sport Ticlacayán	Yanahuanca
Pasco	Deportivo Municipal (Yanahuanca)	Ticlacayán
Piura	Atlético Grau	Paita
Piura	Cultural Progreso	Piura
Puno	Franciscano San Román	San Román
Puno	Diablos Rojos	Puno
San Martín	Unión Tarapoto	San Martín
San Martín	Deportivo Cali	San Martín
Tacna	Mariscal Miller	Tacna
Tacna	Unión Alfonso Ugarte	Tacna
Tumbes	Defensor San José	Tumbes
Tumbes	Barza Sporting	Zorritos
Ucayali	Tecnológico	Ucayali
Ucayali	Deportivo Bancos	Coronel Portillo

== Regional Stage ==
Each region had two teams qualify for the next stage. The playoffs only determined the respective regional winners.

=== Region I ===
Region I includes qualified teams from Amazonas, Lambayeque, Tumbes and Piura region.

==== Group A ====
Pos	Team	Pld	W	D	L	GF	GA	GD	Pts	Qualification	DSJ	GRA	USD	DCH
1	Defensor San José	6	5	0	1	10	1	+9	15	National stage		1–0	2–0	4–0
2	Atlético Grau	6	3	0	3	12	9	+3	9		1–0		5–1	2–1
3	Unión Santo Domingo	6	2	0	4	11	16	−5	6		0–2	4–3		4–0
4	Dínamo	6	2	0	4	7	14	−7	6		0–1	2–1	4–2	

Legend: Blue = home team win; Yellow = draw; Red = away team win.

==== Group B ====
Pos	Team	Pld	W	D	L	GF	GA	GD	Pts	Qualification	SFA	BSP	UNC	CPR
1	San Francisco de Asís (LG)	6	4	1	1	11	7	+4	13	National stage		2–3	1–0	2–1
2	Barza Sporting	6	3	2	1	10	6	+4	11		1–2		0–0	2–1
3	Universidad de Chiclayo	5	1	3	1	6	3	+3	6		1–1	1–1		4–0
4	Cultural Progreso	5	0	0	5	3	14	−11	0		1–3	0–3	W.O.	

Legend: Blue = home team win; Yellow = draw; Red = away team win.

==== Regional Final ====
Team 1	Score	Team 2
Defensor San José	1–0	San Francisco de Asís (LG)

=== Region II ===
Region II includes qualified teams from Ancash, Cajamarca, La Libertad and San Martín region.

==== Group A ====
Pos	Team	Pld	W	D	L	GF	GA	GD	Pts	Qualification	UNT	DMI	JVC	DCT	UTC
1	Universitario de Trujillo	8	6	0	2	21	5	+16	18	National stage		1–0	4–0	4–0	6–1
2	Descendencia Michiquillay	8	4	1	3	9	12	−3	13		3–2		2–1	1–0	3–0
3	Juventud Culebreña	7	3	1	3	11	12	−1	10		1–0	0–0		4–2	3–0
4	Deportivo Cali	6	2	0	4	10	11	−1	6		0–2	6–0	W.O.		2–0
5	UTC	7	2	0	5	7	18	−11	6		0–2	2–0	4–2	W.O.	

Legend: Blue = home team win; Yellow = draw; Red = away team win.

==== Group B ====
Pos	Team	Pld	W	D	L	GF	GA	GD	Pts	Qualification	CAM	RCA	MSI	TAR
1	Carlos A. Mannucci	6	3	1	2	9	2	+7	10	National stage		1–0	1–0	7–0
2	Ramón Castilla	6	3	1	2	10	9	+1	10		1–0		3–1	1–1
3	Deportivo Municipal (San Ignacio)	6	3	0	3	6	7	−1	9		1–0	2–0		2–0
4	Unión Tarapoto	6	1	2	3	8	15	−7	5		0–0	4–5	3–0	

Legend: Blue = home team win; Yellow = draw; Red = away team win.

==== Tiebreaker ====
Team 1	Score	Team 2
Carlos A. Mannucci	4–2	Ramón Castilla

=== Region III ===
Region III includes qualified teams from Loreto and Ucayali region.

Pos	Team	Pld	W	D	L	GF	GA	GD	Pts	Qualification	TEC	UNA	BAN	SFA
1	Tecnológico	6	4	1	1	15	11	+4	13	National stage		3–1	3–2	2–1
2	UNAP	6	2	2	2	9	9	0	8	National stage	3–2		2–0	2–3
3	Deportivo Bancos	6	2	2	2	10	11	−1	8		2–2	1–1		2–1
4	San Francisco de Asís (Contamana)	6	1	1	4	9	12	−3	4		2–3	0–0	2–3	

Legend: Blue = home team win; Yellow = draw; Red = away team win.

==== Tiebreaker ====
Team 1	Score	Team 2
UNAP	4–2	Deportivo Bancos

=== Region IV ===
Region IV includes qualified teams from Lima and Callao region. This region played as a knockout cup system and the finalists qualified.

==== Semifinals ====
Team 1	Agg.	Team 2	1st leg	2nd leg
Juventud La Rural	2–0	Atlético Pilsen Callao	0–0	2–0
DIM	4–2	Atlético Centenario	1–0	3–2

==== Regional Final ====
Team 1	Score	Team 2
Juventud La Rural	1–2	DIM

=== Region V ===
Region V includes qualified teams from Junín, Pasco and Huánuco region.

==== Group A ====
Pos	Team	Pld	W	D	L	GF	GA	GD	Pts	Qualification	ALI	DMY	ADT
1	Alianza Universidad	4	3	1	0	9	4	+5	10	National stage		1–0	3–0
2	Deportivo Municipal (Yanahuanca)	4	1	1	2	5	7	−2	4		2–2		2–1
3	ADT	4	1	0	3	5	8	−3	3		1–2	3–1	

Legend: Blue = home team win; Yellow = draw; Red = away team win.

==== Group B ====
Pos	Team	Pld	W	D	L	GF	GA	GD	Pts	Qualification	LEÓ	SPT	JVC
1	León de Huánuco	4	3	1	0	7	1	+6	10	National stage		2–0	0–0
2	Sport Ticlacayán	4	2	0	2	6	4	+2	6		1–2		4–0
3	Juventud Carhuacatac	4	0	1	3	0	8	−8	1		0–3	0–1	

Legend: Blue = home team win; Yellow = draw; Red = away team win.

==== Regional Final ====
Team 1	Score	Team 2
Alianza Universidad	1–1 (3–2 p)	León de Huánuco

=== Region VI ===
Region VI includes qualified teams from Ayacucho, Huancavelica and Ica region. Two teams qualified from this stage.

==== Group A ====
Pos	Team	Pld	W	D	L	GF	GA	GD	Pts	Qualification	FRO	JML	DRH
1	Froebel Deportes	4	2	1	1	5	3	+2	7	National stage		3–1	1–0
2	Juventud Media Luna	4	1	2	1	5	6	−1	5		2–1		2–2
3	Diablos Rojos (Huancavelica)	4	0	3	1	2	3	−1	3		0–0	0–0	

Legend: Blue = home team win; Yellow = draw; Red = away team win.

==== Group B ====
Pos	Team	Pld	W	D	L	GF	GA	GD	Pts	Qualification	DMH	OLP	SLI
1	Deportivo Municipal (Huamanga)	4	3	1	0	18	3	+15	10	National stage		4–2	10–1
2	Olímpico Peruano	4	2	1	1	15	6	+9	7		0–0		10–1
3	Social Lircay	4	0	0	4	3	27	−24	0		0–4	1–4	

Legend: Blue = home team win; Yellow = draw; Red = away team win.

==== Regional Final ====
Team 1	Score	Team 2
Froebel Deportes	2–0	Deportivo Municipal (Huamanga)

=== Region VII ===
Region VII includes qualified teams from Arequipa, Moquegua and Tacna region.

==== Group A ====
Pos	Team	Pld	W	D	L	GF	GA	GD	Pts	Qualification	UAU	SLO	JVC
1	Unión Alfonso Ugarte	4	2	2	0	6	2	+4	8	Región VII - Semifinals		3–0	2–2
2	San Lino de Omate	4	1	2	1	3	5	−2	5	Región VII - Semifinals	0–0		1–0
3	Juventus Corazón	4	0	2	2	4	6	−2	2		0–1	2–2	

Legend: Blue = home team win; Yellow = draw; Red = away team win.

==== Group B ====
Pos	Team	Pld	W	D	L	GF	GA	GD	Pts	Qualification	UMO	DPE	MMI
1	Unión Minas de Orcopampa	4	4	0	0	17	3	+14	12	Región VII - Semifinals		1–0	10–0
2	Deportivo Enersur	4	2	0	2	7	6	+1	6	Región VII - Semifinals	2–3		3–1
3	Mariscal Miller	4	0	0	4	3	18	−15	0		1–3	1–2	

Legend: Blue = home team win; Yellow = draw; Red = away team win.

==== Semifinals ====
Team 1	Agg.	Team 2	1st leg	2nd leg
Unión Alfonso Ugarte	5–2	Deportivo Enersur	2–1	3–1
Unión Minas de Orcopampa	8–2	San Lino	4–1	4–1

=== Region VIII ===
Region VIII includes qualified teams from Apurimac, Cusco, Madre de Dios and Puno region.

==== Group A ====
Pos	Team	Pld	W	D	L	GF	GA	GD	Pts	Qualification	JMA	DPG	FSR	MIN
1	José María Arguedas	5	4	0	1	14	3	+11	12	National stage		2–1	4–0	3–0
2	Deportivo Garcilaso	6	3	1	2	14	12	+2	10		1–0		3–4	4–2
3	Franciscano San Román	5	2	2	1	13	11	+2	8		W.O.	2–2		5–0
4	MINSA	6	0	1	5	7	22	−15	1		1–5	2–3	2–2	

Legend: Blue = home team win; Yellow = draw; Red = away team win.

==== Group B ====
Pos	Team	Pld	W	D	L	GF	GA	GD	Pts	Qualification	DRJ	DPE	HLC	JJT
1	Diablos Rojos	6	3	1	2	17	9	+8	10	National stage		2–1	4–3	9–1
2	Deportivo Educación	6	3	1	2	9	7	+2	10		2–1		4–1	1–0
3	Humberto Luna	6	2	1	3	9	12	−3	7		0–0	2–0		3–0
4	Juventud La Joya	6	2	1	3	8	15	−7	7		2–1	1–1	4–0	

Legend: Blue = home team win; Yellow = draw; Red = away team win.

==== Tiebreaker ====
Team 1	Score	Team 2
Diablos Rojos	4–1	Deportivo Educación

==== Regional Final ====
Team 1	Agg.	Team 2	1st leg	2nd leg
José María Arguedas	3–6 (4–3 p)	Diablos Rojos	1–6	2–0

== National Stage ==
The National Stage started on November 8. This stage had two knockout rounds and four-team group stage. The winner will be promoted to the First Division and the runner-up of the National Stage will be promoted to the Segunda División Peruana.

Round of 16
Defensor San José	2	0	2 (3)
Universitario (T)	0	2	2 (2)
Carlos A. Mannucci	0	2	2
San Francisco de Asís (LG)	1	0	1
Tecnológico	0	3	3
Juventud La Rural	2	0	2
DIM	1	3	4
UNAP	2	0	2
Alianza Universidad	3	1	4
Deportivo Municipal (Huamanga)	2	1	3
Froebel Deportes	3	0	3
León de Huánuco	1	2	3
Unión Minas (O)	1	2	3
Diablos Rojos	2	4	6
José María Arguedas	2	1	3
Unión Alfonso Ugarte	1	4	4

Quarterfinals
Defensor San José	1	1 (5)	2
Carlos A. Mannucci	1	1 (4)	2
Tecnológico	0	1	1
DIM	0	0	0
Alianza Universidad	0	0	0
León de Huánuco	0	1	1
Diablos Rojos	2	2	4
Unión Alfonso Ugarte	1	2	3

Semifinals
Defensor San José	2	0	2
Tecnológico	0	3	3
León de Huánuco	2	1	3
Diablos Rojos	0	2	2

Champion & Runner-Up
Tecnológico	1	0	1
León de Huánuco	1	0	1

=== Round of 16 ===
Team 1	Agg.	Team 2	1st leg	2nd leg
Defensor San José	2–2 (3–2 p)	Universitario de Trujillo	2–0	0–2
San Francisco de Asís (LG)	1–2	Carlos A. Mannucci	1–0	0–2
Tecnológico	3–2	Juventud La Rural	0–2	3–0
DIM	4–2	UNAP	1–2	3–0
Alianza Universidad	4–3	Deportivo Municipal (Huamanga)	3–2	1–1
Froebel Deportes	3–3 (a)	León de Huánuco	3–1	0–2
Unión Minas de Orcopampa	3–6	Diablos Rojos	1–2	2–4
José María Arguedas	3–4	Unión Alfonso Ugarte	2–1	1–4

=== Quarterfinals ===
Team 1	Agg.	Team 2	1st leg	2nd leg
Defensor San José	2–2 (5–4 p)	Carlos A. Mannucci	1–1	1–1
Tecnológico	1–0	DIM	0–0	1–0
Alianza Universidad	0–1	León de Huánuco	0–0	0–1
Diablos Rojos	4–3	Unión Alfonso Ugarte	2–1	2–2

=== Semifinals ===
Team 1	Agg.	Team 2	1st leg	2nd leg
Defensor San José	2–3	Tecnológico	2–0	0–3
León de Huánuco	3–2	Diablos Rojos	2–0	1–2

=== Final ===
Team 1	Agg.	Team 2	1st leg	2nd leg
Tecnológico	1–1 (a)	León de Huánuco	1–1	0–0

== See also ==
- 2009 Torneo Descentralizado
- 2009 Peruvian Segunda División
