= Marcas District =

Coordinates: 12.8902°S 74.3979°W

Marcas
- District
- Interactive map of Marcas
- Country: Peru
- Region: Huancavelica
- Province: Acobamba
- Founded: November 23, 1925
- Capital: Marcas

Government
  - Mayor: Vicente Jorge Torres

Area
  - Total: 155.87 km^{2} (60.18 sq mi)
- Elevation: 3,394 m (11,135 ft)

Population (2005 census)
  - Total: 2,380
  - Density: 15.3/km^{2} (39.5/sq mi)
- Time zone: UTC-5 (PET)
- UBIGEO: 090205

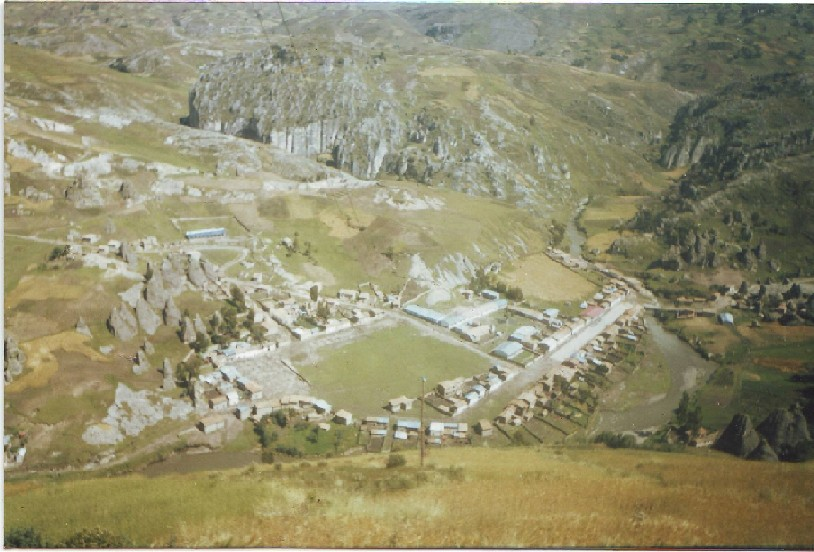
Huayanay 2009

Marcas District is one of eight districts of the Acobamba Province in Peru.

== Geography ==
One of the highest peaks of the district is Uma Kunka at approximately 4,000 m (13,000 ft). Other mountains are listed below:

- Añas Waqra
- Mulli Pata
- Parquy Urqu
- P'iqiri
- Qullqi Q'asa
- Q'illu Urqu
- Sapalluyuq
- Silla Qucha
- Tinyaq Urqu
- Wik'uñayuq
- Yana Urqu

== Ethnic groups ==
The people in the district are mainly Indigenous citizens of Quechua descent. Quechua is the language which the majority of the population (80.31%) learnt to speak in childhood, 19.33% of the residents started speaking using the Spanish language (2007 Peru Census).
