= Unión Supe =

Peruvian football club

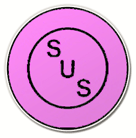
- Full name: Club Deportivo Sport Unión Supe
- Nickname: "Los Picapiedras"
- Founded: October 12, 1954
- Ground: Estadio Edgardo Reyes Bolívar, Supe
- Chairman: Tomás Delgado
- League: Copa Perú
Home colours

Unión Supe is a Peruvian football club, from the city of Supe, Barranca, Lima. It was founded in 1954 and currently plays in the Copa Perú.

== History ==
In the 2008 Copa Perú, the club qualified to the National Stage, but was eliminated by Colegio Nacional de Iquitos in the quarterfinals.

In the 2009 Copa Perú, the club was eliminated in the Departmental Stage by the Deportivo Independiente Miraflores of Miraflores in the quarterfinals.

== Honours ==
=== Regional ===
- Región IV:

Runner-up (1): 2008

- Liga Departamental de Lima:

Runner-up (2): 1996, 2008

- Liga Provincial de Barranca:

Winners (3): 1985, 1996, 2022

- Liga Distrital de Supe Pueblo:

Winners (8): 2008, 2010, 2017, 2019, 2022, 2023, 2024, 2025
Runner-up (2): 2015

== See also ==
- List of football clubs in Peru
- Peruvian football league system
