= Pomacocha District, Acobamba =

Coordinates: 12.8741°S 74.5317°W

Pomacocha Pumaqucha
- District
- Interactive map of Pomacocha
- Country: Peru
- Region: Huancavelica
- Province: Acobamba
- Founded: January 15, 1943
- Capital: Pomacocha

Government
  - Mayor: Salvador Calderon Belito

Area
  - Total: 53.66 km^{2} (20.72 sq mi)
- Elevation: 3,150 m (10,330 ft)

Population (2005 census)
  - Total: 3,965
  - Density: 73.89/km^{2} (191.4/sq mi)
- Time zone: UTC-5 (PET)
- UBIGEO: 090207

Pomacocha District is one of eight districts of the province Acobamba in Peru.

== Ethnic groups ==
The people in the district are mainly Indigenous citizens of Quechua descent. Quechua is the language which the majority of the population (78.82%) learnt to speak in childhood, 20.61% of the residents started speaking using the Spanish language (2007 Peru Census).
