= Olímpico Peruano =

Peruvian football club

- Full name: Club Sport Olímpico Peruano
- Founded: February 2, 1945
- Ground: Enrique José Picasso Peratta, Ica
- Capacity: 8,000
- Chairman: Sabino Vasquez Diaz
- League: Copa Perú
Home colours

Olímpico Peruano is a Peruvian football club, playing in the city of Santiago, Ica, Peru.

== Honours ==
=== National ===
- Liga Departamental de Ica: 0

Runner-up (1): 2009

- Liga Provincial de Ica: 0

Runner-up (1): 2009

- Liga Distrital de Santiago: 1

2009
Runner-up (1): 2008

== See also ==
- List of football clubs in Peru
- Peruvian football league system
