= Acobamba District, Acobamba =

Coordinates: 12.8418°S 74.5708°W

Acobamba Aqupampa
- District
- Interactive map of Acobamba
- Country: Peru
- Region: Huancavelica
- Province: Acobamba
- Founded: January 15, 1943
- Capital: Acobamba
- Subdivisions: 25 populated centers

Government
  - Mayor: Rolando Vargas Mendoza

Area
  - Total: 123.02 km^{2} (47.50 sq mi)
- Elevation: 2,940 m (9,650 ft)

Population (2017)
  - Total: 8,980
  - Density: 73.0/km^{2} (189/sq mi)
- Time zone: UTC-5 (PET)
- UBIGEO: 090201
- Website: acobamba.hca.mp.gob.pe

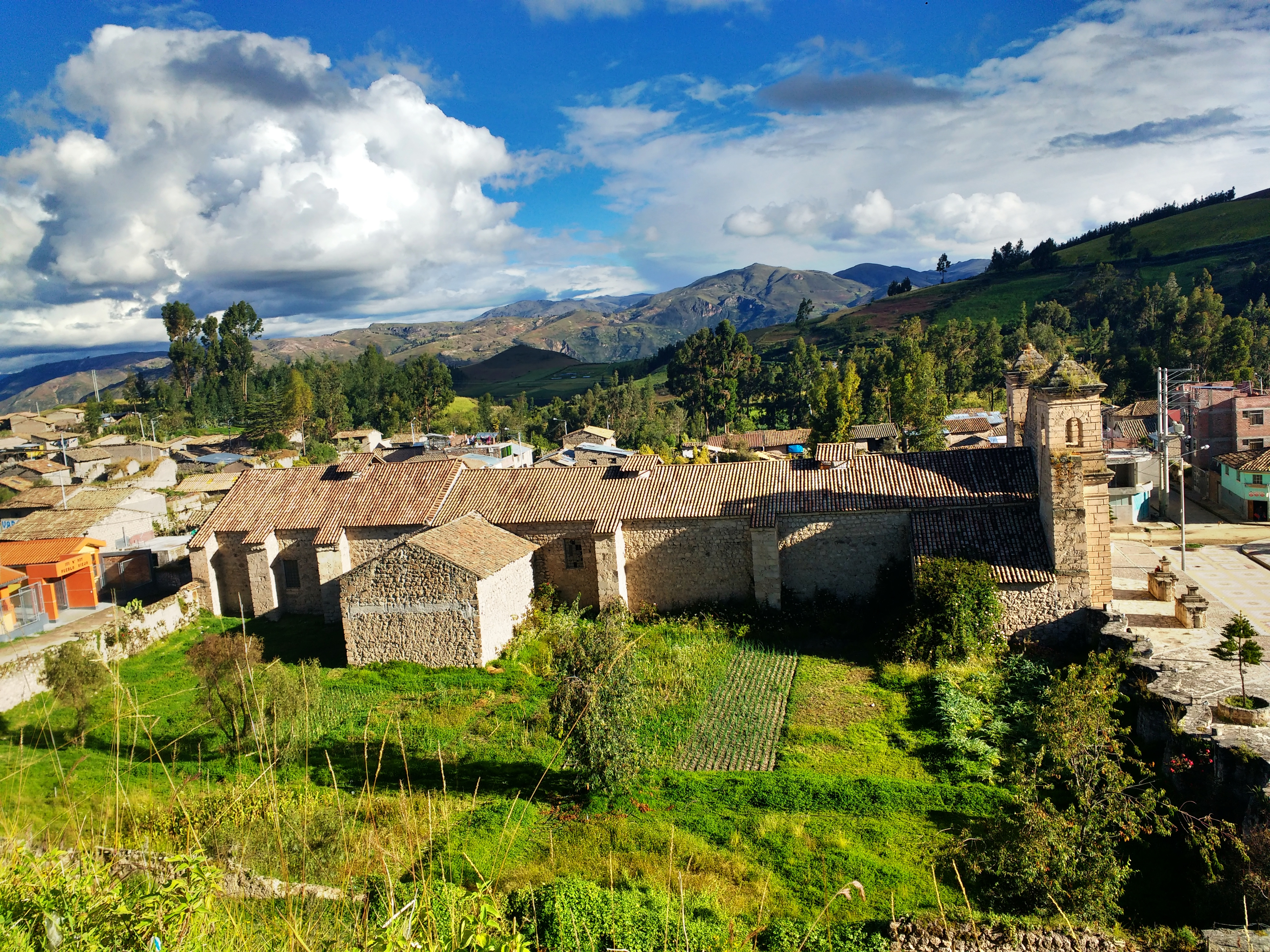
The Colonial Church of San Bautista, Acobamba

The Acobamba District is one of the eight districts in the Acobamba Province in Peru. It was created by Law No. 9718 on January 15, 1943. Its capital is Acobamba.

== Ethnic groups ==
The people in the district are mainly Indigenous citizens of Quechua descent. Quechua is the language which the majority of the population (62.07%) learnt to speak in childhood, 37.64% of the residents started speaking using the Spanish language (2007 Peru Census).

== Climate ==
Climate data for Acobamba, elevation 3,399 m (11,152 ft), (1991–2020)
Month	Jan	Feb	Mar	Apr	May	Jun	Jul	Aug	Sep	Oct	Nov	Dec	Year
Mean daily maximum °C (°F)	18.4 (65.1)	18.1 (64.6)	18.1 (64.6)	18.6 (65.5)	19.1 (66.4)	18.7 (65.7)	18.6 (65.5)	19.2 (66.6)	19.5 (67.1)	20.2 (68.4)	20.8 (69.4)	19.4 (66.9)	19.1 (66.3)
Mean daily minimum °C (°F)	7.0 (44.6)	7.1 (44.8)	7.0 (44.6)	6.3 (43.3)	4.7 (40.5)	3.4 (38.1)	2.7 (36.9)	3.6 (38.5)	5.1 (41.2)	6.1 (43.0)	6.5 (43.7)	6.8 (44.2)	5.5 (41.9)
Average precipitation mm (inches)	120.1 (4.73)	127.2 (5.01)	94.5 (3.72)	39.2 (1.54)	19.4 (0.76)	8.1 (0.32)	10.2 (0.40)	17.0 (0.67)	22.9 (0.90)	51.4 (2.02)	48.6 (1.91)	101.9 (4.01)	660.5 (25.99)
Source: National Meteorology and Hydrology Service of Peru

== See also ==
- Killa Mach'ay
