= Diablos Rojos de Juliaca =

Peruvian football club

Diablos Rojos
- Full name: Club Deportivo Diablos Rojos
- Nickname: Colorados
- Founded: January 15, 1965
- Ground: Guillermo Briceño Rosamedina
- Capacity: 20,030
- Chairman: Vidal Huaracha
- Manager: César Espino
- League: Copa Perú
Home colours	Away colours

Diablos Rojos is a Peruvian football club, playing in the city of Juliaca, Peru. The club was founded in 1965 and plays in Copa Perú which is the fourth division of Peruvian football.

== History ==
The club has played at the highest level of Peruvian football on five occasions, from 1983 Torneo Descentralizado until 1985 Torneo Descentralizado, and from 1987 Torneo Descentralizado until 1991 Torneo Descentralizado, when it was relegated.

In 2008 Copa Perú, the club qualified to the National stage, but was eliminated by IDUNSA of Arequipa in the quarterfinals.

In 2009 Copa Perú, the club again qualified to the National stage, but was eliminated by León de Huánuco in the semifinals.

== Rivalries ==
Diablos Rojos has had a long-standing rivalry with Alfonso Ugarte and Unión Carolina.

== Honours ==
=== Senior titles ===
Keys

- Record
- ^{(s)} Shared record

Type	Competition	Titles	Runner-up	Winning years	Runner-up years
Half-year / Short tournament (League)	Torneo Zona Sur	—	1	—	1984
Regional (League)	Región VII	—	1	—	1983
Regional (League)	Región VIII	1	1	2008	2009
Regional (League)	Liga Departamental de Puno	1	3	2008	2009, 2023, 2024
Regional (League)	Liga Superior de Puno	1	—	2008	—
Regional (League)	Liga Provincial de San Román	2	2	2015, 2016	2014, 2023
Regional (League)	Liga Distrital de Juliaca	2	3	2014, 2023	2015, 2016, 2017

== See also ==
- List of football clubs in Peru
- Peruvian football league system
