= Anta District, Acobamba =

Coordinates: 12.8122°S 74.6385°W

Anta District
- District
- Interactive map of Anta District
- Country: Peru
- Region: Huancavelica
- Province: Acobamba
- Founded: January 15, 1943
- Capital: Anta

Government
  - Mayor: Maximiliano Taipe Palacios

Area
  - Total: 91.36 km^{2} (35.27 sq mi)
- Elevation: 3,600 m (11,800 ft)

Population (2005 census)
  - Total: 6,466
  - Density: 70.77/km^{2} (183.3/sq mi)
- Time zone: UTC-5 (PET)
- UBIGEO: 090203

Anta District is one of eight districts of the province Acobamba in Peru.

== Ethnic groups ==
The people in the district are mainly Indigenous citizens of Quechua descent. Quechua is the language which the majority of the population (98.48%) learnt to speak in childhood, 1.37% of the residents started speaking using the Spanish language (2007 Peru Census).
