= Rosario District, Acobamba =

Coordinates: 12.7211°S 74.5825°W

Rosario District
- District
- Interactive map of Rosario District
- Country: Peru
- Region: Huancavelica
- Province: Acobamba
- Founded: November 24, 1955
- Capital: Rosario

Government
  - Mayor: Magno Tuscano Huamani

Area
  - Total: 97.07 km^{2} (37.48 sq mi)
- Elevation: 3,640 m (11,940 ft)

Population (2005 census)
  - Total: 6,791
  - Density: 69.96/km^{2} (181.2/sq mi)
- Time zone: UTC-5 (PET)
- UBIGEO: 090208

Rosario District is one of eight districts of the province Acobamba in Peru.

== Ethnic groups ==
The people in the district are mainly Indigenous citizens of Quechua descent. Quechua is the language which the majority of the population (97.21%) learnt to speak in childhood, 2.57% of the residents started speaking using the Spanish language (2007 Peru Census).
