= Paucará =

Town in Huancavelica Region, Peru

Coordinates: 12°44′S 74°40′W

Paucará is a town in Peru. It is the capital of the Paucara district in the Acobamba Province inside the Huancavelica Region.

According to the Peruvian 1993 census, it has a population of 1,886.
