= Tecnológico de Pucallpa =

Peruvian football club

Instituto Superior Tecnológico Suiza
- Full name: Club Social Deportivo Instituto Superior Tecnológico Suiza
- Nickname(s): El Tec, Los albicelestes
- Founded: December 15, 2005
- Ground: Estadio Aliardo Soria Pérez, Pucallpa
- Capacity: 17,848
- Chairman: Vicente Rivera
- Manager: José Chacaltana
- League: Segunda División Peruana
- Peru Cup 2009: 2nd
Home colours	Away colours

Tecnológico is a Peruvian football club, playing in the city of Pucallpa, Peru.

== History ==
In the 2009 Copa Perú, the club qualified to the National Stage, but was eliminated by León de Huánuco in the finals.

In the 2010 Segunda División, the club was last place and was relegated to the Copa Perú.

In the 2011 Copa Perú, the club was eliminated by Los Tigres in the Regional Stage.

== Honours ==
=== National ===
- Copa Perú: 0

Runner-up (1): 2009

=== Regional ===
- Región III: 1

Winners (1): 2009
Runner-up (1): 2008

- Liga Departamental de Ucayali: 2

Winners (2): 2008, 2009

== See also ==
- List of football clubs in Peru
- Peruvian football league system
