= Deportivo Municipal de Huamanga =

Peruvian football club

- Full name: Club Centro Deportivo Municipal de Huamanga
- Nickname(s): Jirafales, Ediles
- Founded: July 10, 1995
- Ground: Ciudad de Cumaná, Ayacucho
- Capacity: 12,000
- Chairman: Germán Martinelli
- Manager: Pedro Gonzáles
- League: Copa Perú
Home colours	Away colours

Deportivo Municipal de Huamanga is a Peruvian football club, playing in the city of Huamanga, Ayacucho, Peru.

== Honours ==
=== Regional ===
- Región VI: 0

Runner-up (1): 2009

- Liga Departamental de Ayacucho: 2

Winners (2): 2005, 2009

- Liga Superior de Ayacucho: 1

Winners (1): 2009

== See also ==
- List of football clubs in Peru
- Peruvian football league system
