= Aguas Verdes District =

Coordinates: 3.4819°S 80.2456°W

Aguas Verdes
- District
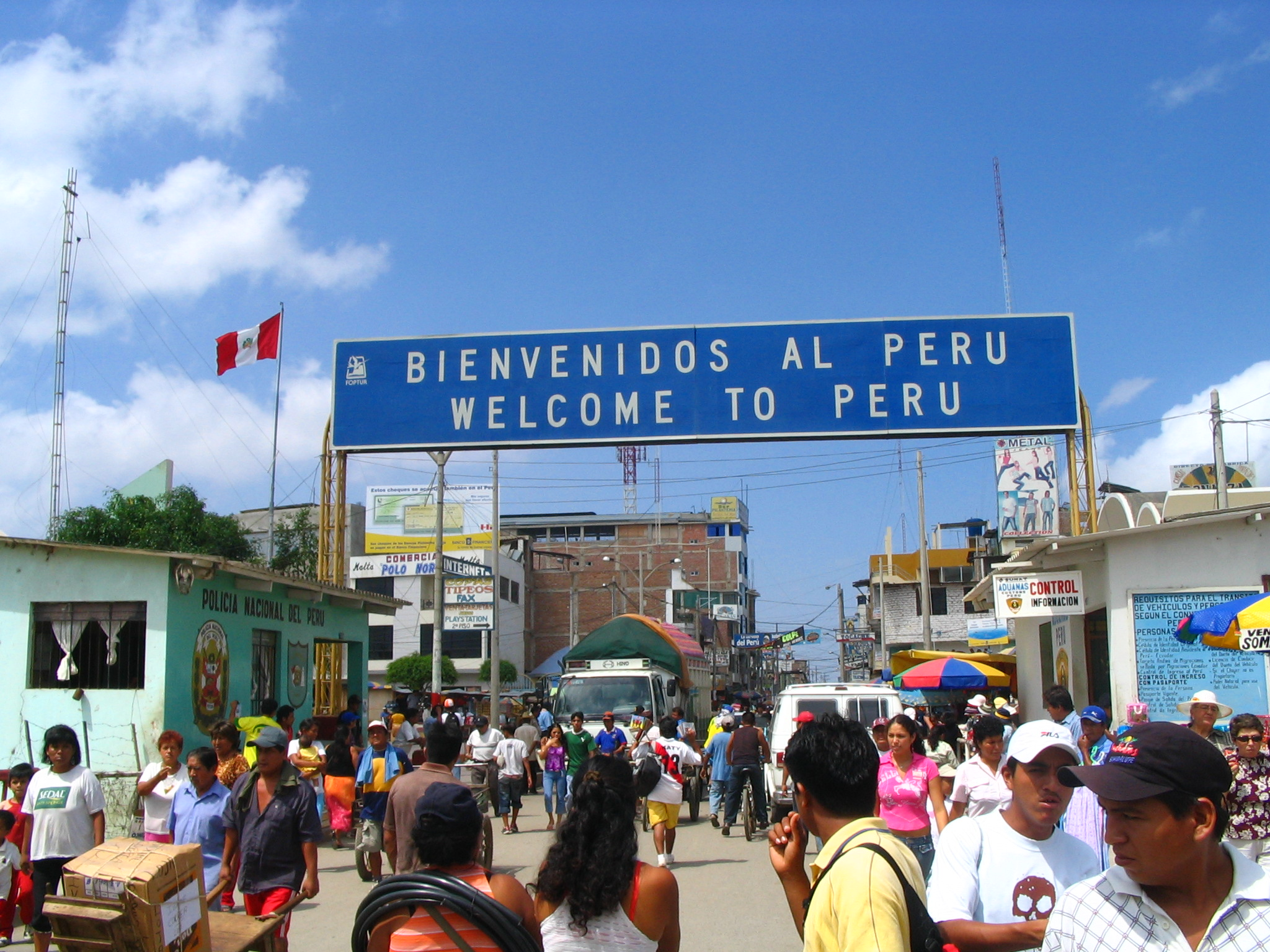
- The town of Aguas Verdes, capital of the district, as seen from the international bridge

- Coat of arms

- Location of Aguas Verdes District in the Zarumilla province
- Country: Peru
- Region: Tumbes
- Province: Zarumilla
- Founded: January 11, 1985

Area
  - Total: 46.06 km^{2} (17.78 sq mi)
- Elevation: 7 m (23 ft)

Population (2002 est.)
  - Total: 12,789
  - Density: 277.7/km^{2} (719.1/sq mi)
- Time zone: UTC-5 (PET)
- Website: muniaguasverdes.gob.pe

Aguas Verdes is a district in the Zarumilla Province of the Tumbes Region in northwestern Peru. Its capital is the town of Aguas Verdes, which is on the banks of the Zarumilla River. Located on the border with Ecuador, Aguas Verdes serves as the largest international point of entry in Peru's northern border. This district is located right across the river from the Ecuadorian town of Huaquillas.

Officially established as a district on January 11, 1985, its current mayor is José Llatance Fernández.

== Geography ==
The district has a total land area of 46.06 km^{2}. Its capital is located 7 meters above sea level.

=== Boundaries ===
- North and West: Zarumilla District
- East: Huaquillas Canton (Ecuador)
- South: Papayal District

== Demographics ==
According to a 2002 estimate by the INEI, the district has 12,789 inhabitants and a population density of 277.7 persons/km^{2}. In 1999, there were 2,505 households in the district.

== Towns and other settlements ==
- Aguas Verdes
- Cuchareta Alta
- Cuchareta Baja
- El Canario
- El Salitral
- La Curva
- Loma Saavedra
- Nueva Esperanza
- Pocitos
