= Tumbes District =

Coordinates: 3.5667°S 80.4500°W

Tumbes
- District
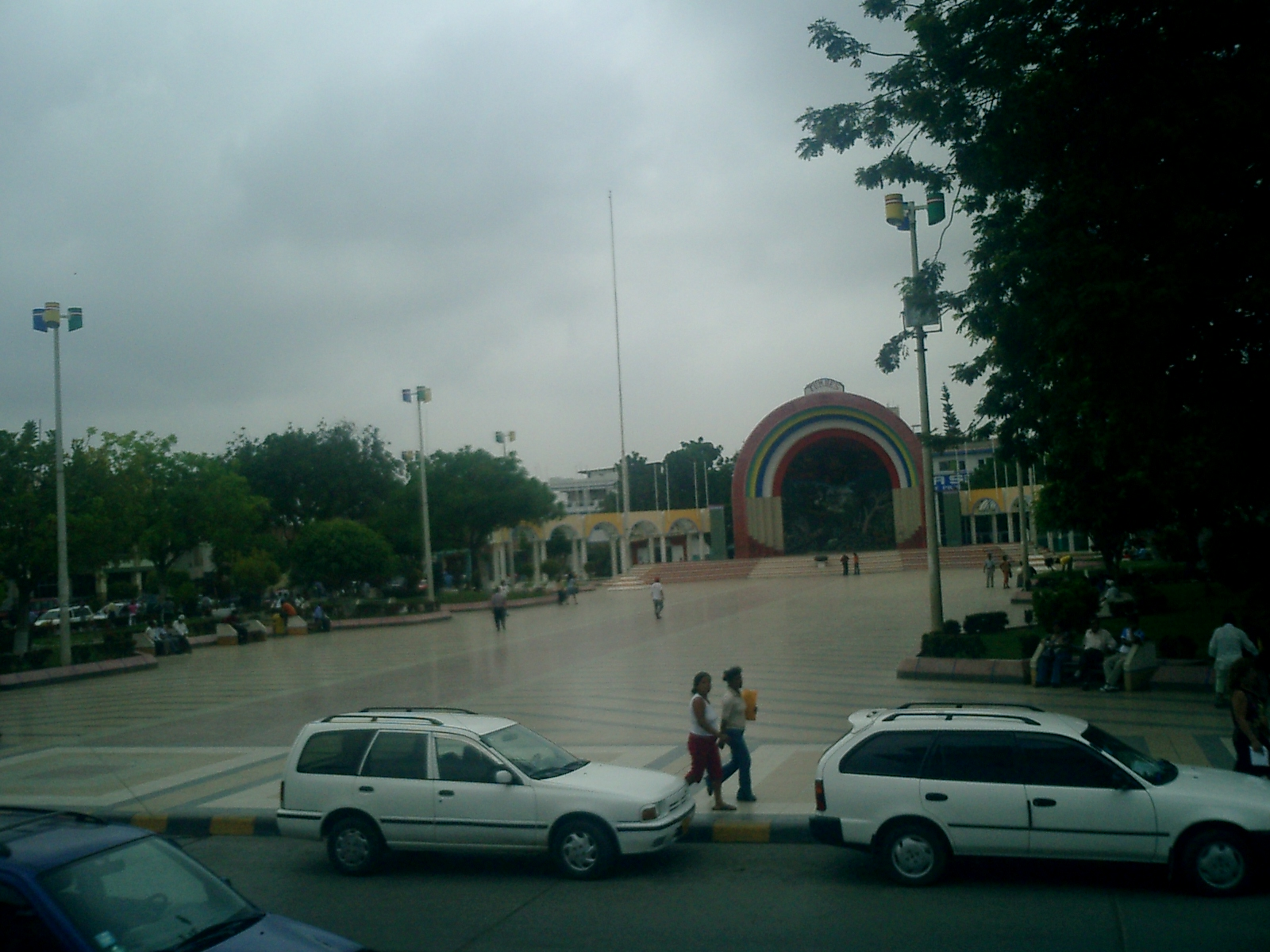
- Main square
- Interactive map of Tumbes
- Country: Peru
- Region: Tumbes
- Province: Tumbes
- Founded: July 21, 1821
- Capital: Tumbes
- Subdivisions: 20 populated centers

Government
  - Mayor: Jimmy Silva (2019-2022)

Area
  - Total: 158.84 km^{2} (61.33 sq mi)
- Elevation: 7 m (23 ft)

Population (2017)
  - Total: 102,306
  - Density: 644.08/km^{2} (1,668.2/sq mi)
- Time zone: UTC-5 (PET)
- Website: munitumbes.gob.pe

Tumbes is a district in the middle Tumbes Province in Peru. It is bordered by Corrales District on the west, Pacific Ocean on the north, Zarumilla Province on the east, and San Juan de la Virgen District on the south.
