= Miss Perú 1999 =

- Date: April 20, 1999
- Presenters: Humberto Martínez Morosini
- Venue: María Angola Convention Center, Miraflores District, Lima
- Broadcaster: América Televisión
- Entrants: 23
- Winner: Fabiola Lazo; Distrito Capital

The Miss Perú 1999 pageant was held on April 20, 1999. That year, 23 candidates were competing for the national crown. The chosen winner represented Peru at the Miss Universe 1999. The rest of the finalists would enter in different pageants.

== Placements ==
Final Results	Contestant
Miss Peru Universe 1999	Distrito Capital - Fabiola Lazo
1st Runner-Up	La Libertad – Raquel Pérez Quevedo
2nd Runner-Up	Ucayali – Sandra Meza
Top 6	Tumbes – Thalía Estabridis; Ancash – Katiuska Romero; Puno – Silvana Pimentel
Top 10	Pasco – Larisa Velasco; Lambayeque – Karolina Mimbela; San Martín – Llubitza Banic; Madre de Dios – Elba Miasta

== Special awards ==
- Best Regional Costume - Amazonas – Ana María Pareja
- Miss Photogenic - Lambayeque – Karolina Mimbela
- Miss Elegance - Ucayali – Sandra Meza
- Miss Body - Distrito Capital - Fabiola Lazo
- Best Hair - Tacna – Malu Costa
- Miss Congeniality - Puno – Silvana Pimentel
- Most Beautiful Face - Apurímac – Rocío Mejía
- Most Beautiful Eyes - Pasco – Larisa Velasco

== Delegates ==
- Amazonas – Ana María Pareja
- Áncash – Katiuska Romero
- Apurímac – Rocío Mejía
- Arequipa – Paola de la Jara
- Ayacucho – Karla Farias
- Callao – Daniela Aspe
- Cuzco – Romina Robinson
- Distrito Capital – Fabiola Lazo
- Huancavelica – Leslie Montoya
- Huánuco – Elsa Guerra
- Ica – Karen Meza
- Junín – Mayte Duenas
- La Libertad – Raquel Pérez Quevedo
- Lambayeque – Karolina Mimbela
- Loreto – Vanessa Gamboa
- Madre de Dios – Elba Miasta
- Pasco – Larissa Velazco
- Piura – Carolina Brandon
- Puno – Silvana Pimentel
- San Martín – Llubitza Banic
- Tacna – Malu Costa
- Tumbes – Thalía Estabridis
- Ucayali – Sandra Meza

== Judges ==
- Ana Colchero - Soap Opera Actress
- Gian Marco Zignago - Peruvian Singer & Songwriter
- Laura Bozzo - Peruvian Talk show Hostess
- Dr.Frank Zegarra - Plastic Surgeon
- Acirema Alayeto - President of the Miss Latin America Org.
- Eleazar Molina - Jewel Designer
- Beto Ortiz - Peruvian Journalist & Writer
- Sonia Oquendo - Peruvian Actress
- Luis Uzcategui - Fashion Designer
- Claudia Dopf Scansi - Miss Peru 1997
