= Aguas Verdes =

Peruvian town in the Tumbes region

Coordinates: 3°29′S 80°15′W

- Town
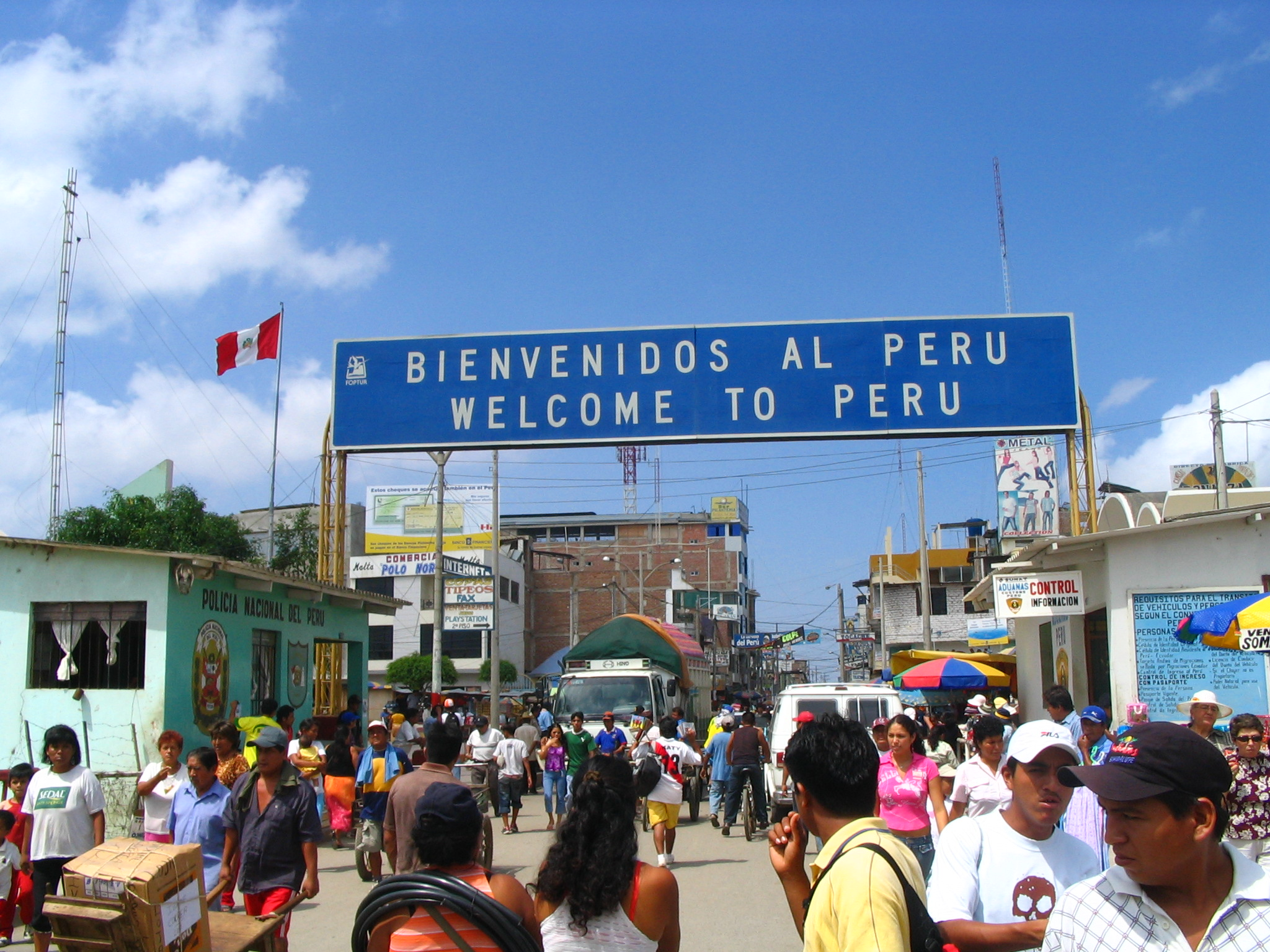
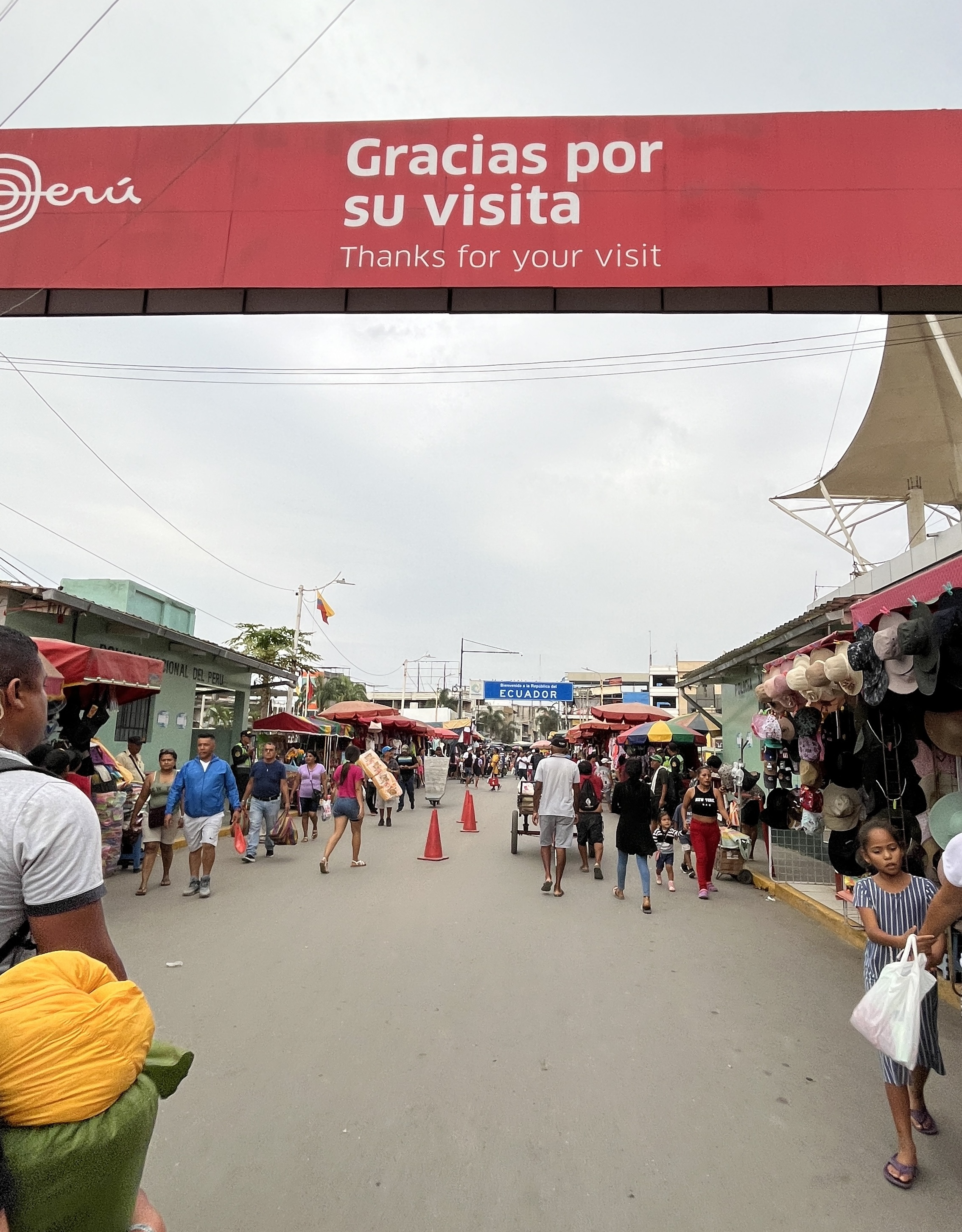
- Sign welcoming people entering Peru and Aguas Verdes, located on the town's main street and right after crossing the international bridge Sign thanking people leaving Peru and Aguas Verdes and entering Ecuador
- Interactive map of Aguas Verdes
- Country: Peru
- Department: Tumbes
- Province: Zarumilla
- Time zone: UTC−05:00 (PET)

Aguas Verdes (literally "green waters") is a town in the Zarumilla Province of the Tumbes Region in northwestern Peru. It has a population of 2,390 (1999) and is capital of the Aguas Verdes District.

Aguas Verdes is located in the border with Ecuador. An international bridge that goes over the Zarumilla River connects it with the Ecuadorian town of Huaquillas. Both towns have an intense commercial life and many formal, as well as informal street sellers that sell goods both in Peruvian soles and US dollars, which is the only currency in Ecuador.

A free transit agreement exists and people from both countries can travel freely between these towns. Peruvian and Ecuadorian immigration control posts are located further inland to both sides of the border.

Aguas Verdes is located 27 km northeast of Tumbes, the regional capital. Since it is a rather chaotic town, tourists are advised to take a cab when visiting Aguas Verdes.

The northern terminus of the Pan-American Highway, the largest road in the country, is located in Aguas Verdes at the border crossing.
