= Manglares de Tumbes National Sanctuary =

Protected area in Tumbes, Peru

- Santuario Nacional Manglares de Tumbes
- IUCN category III (natural monument or feature)
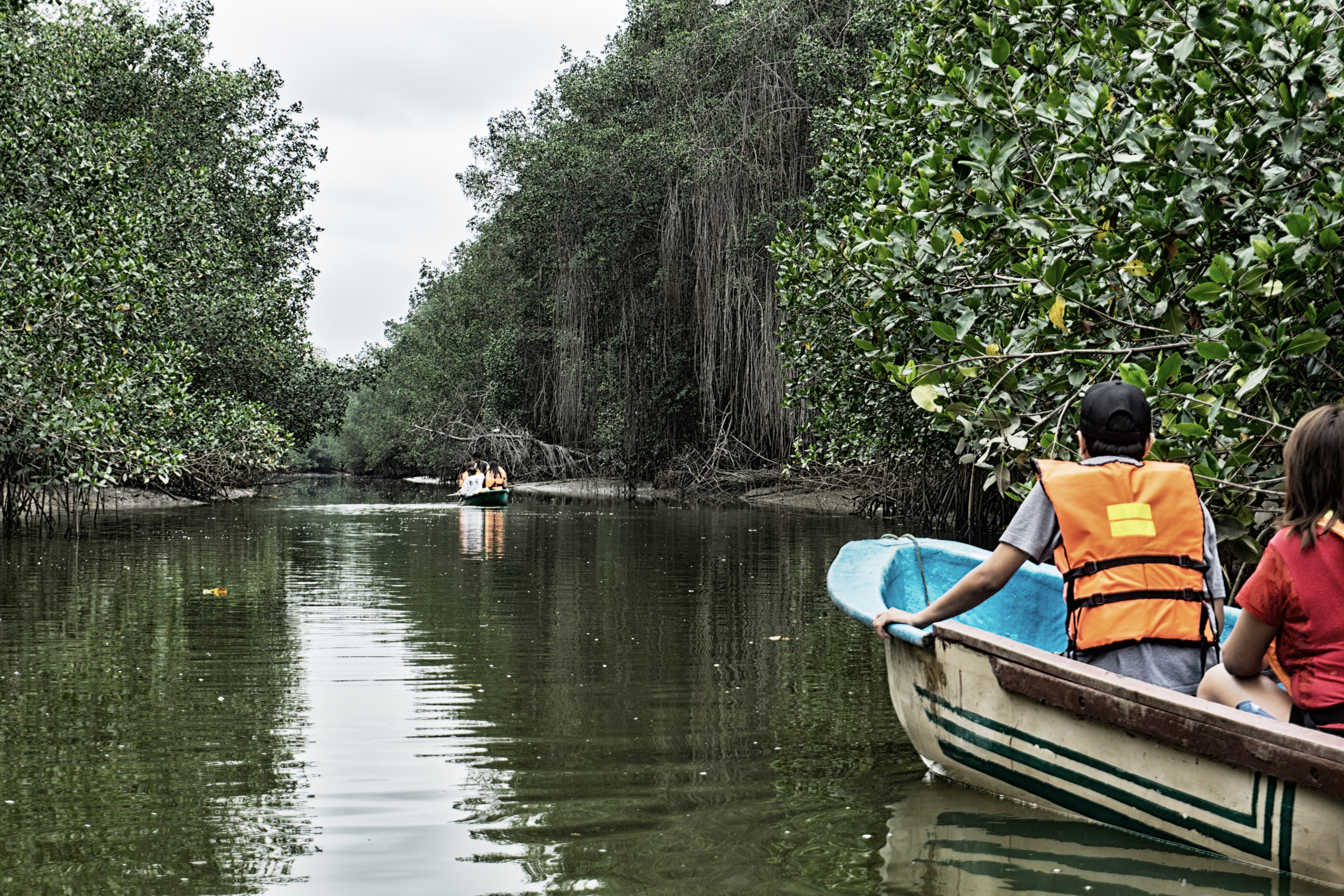
- Waterway at Manglares de Tumbes National Sanctuary.

- Location within Peru
- Interactive map of Manglares de Tumbes National Sanctuary
- Location: Peru; Tumbes
- Nearest city: Zarumilla
- Coordinates: 3°25′12″S 80°16′30″W
- Area: 29.72 km^{2} (11.47 mi^{2})
- Established: 1988
- Governing body: SERNANP
- Website: Santuario Nacional Manglares de Tumbes (in Spanish)

Ramsar Wetland
- Official name: Santuario Nacional Los Manglares de Tumbes
- Designated: 20 January 1997
- Reference no.: 883

Manglares de Tumbes National Sanctuary is a protected natural area located in the region of Tumbes, Peru. Established in 1988, it protects the largest area of mangrove forest in Peru.

== Geography ==
This protected area is located in Zarumilla Province, Tumbes; close to the border with Ecuador. With an area of 29.72 square kilometres (11.47 sq mi), it harbors the largest mangrove forest in Peru.

== Ecology ==
=== Flora ===
Five species of mangrove dominate the area: black mangrove (Avicennia germinans), white mangrove (Laguncularia racemosa), button mangrove (Conocarpus erectus) and two species of red mangrove (Rhizophora mangle and Rhizophora harrisonii). Seasonally dry forest and scrubland can also be found in some parts of the sanctuary; tree species representative of this ecosystem being: Pithecellobium excelsum, Cordia lutea, Mimosa acantholoba, Parkinsonia praecox, Ceiba trischistandra, Loxopterygium huasango, Bursera graveolens, Cochlospermum spp., Prosopis pallida, Capparis scabrida; and some seasonal herbaceous species: Aristida adscensionis, Bouteloua aristidoides, Stylosanthes spp., Crotalaria spp.,Tephrosia cinerea, Cyperus spp., Scirpus spp., Distichlis spicata, Antephora hermaphrodita, Paspalum racemosum, Ipomoea spp., and Bidens pilosa.

=== Fauna ===
The sanctuary protects 148 species of birds, being some of them the yellow-crowned night heron, the rufous-necked wood rail, the American yellow warbler and the American white ibis.

The sanctuary also protects 105 fish species, plus some other 40 migrant species.

Mammals found in the area include the crab-eating raccoon, the silky anteater and the neotropical otter.

Also, 33 snail species, 34 crustacean species, 24 bivalve species and 9 reptile species are found in the sanctuary.

== Recreation ==
It is possible to navigate, by kayak or canoe, the waterways inside the mangrove forest in the zone accessible to tourists (137,5 hectares = 4,61% of the sanctuary). In this area activities like walking on beaches, birdwatching and observation of the use of the mangrove ecosystem by the locals are also allowed.

Scientific research has been a constant activity since the creation of the sanctuary.

== Environmental issues ==
The clearance of mangrove forests and nearby seasonally dry forests to open land for shrimp farming and agriculture has an enormous impact on local ecosystems. Shrimp farms also capture and grow larva of local shrimp species from the mangrove forests with help of local inhabitants. These farms and agricultural lands also pollute the area with industrial waste and agricultural runoff.

Illegal extraction of edible crustaceans and bivalves; conflicts over land use rights with nearby villages and litter and wastewater discharge from nearby towns into the mangrove forest canals are also environmental issues affecting the sanctuary.

Introduced plant species like Tephrosia purpurea, Dactyloctenium aegyptium, Eragrostis cilianensis and Brachiaria mutica are found growing inside this protected area.

The American crocodile is no longer present in the area, rendering this species as one of the most threatened in the country.
