= Muricanthus callidinus =

Scientific classification
- Kingdom: Animalia
- Phylum: Mollusca
- Class: Gastropoda
- Subclass: Caenogastropoda
- Order: Neogastropoda
- Family: Muricidae
- Subfamily: Muricinae
- Genus: Muricanthus
- Species: M. callidinus

Binomial name
- Muricanthus callidinus Berry, 1958

Synonyms
- Murex nitidus Broderip, 1833 (invalid: junior homonym of Murex nitidus Pilkington, 1804)

Species of gastropod

Muricanthus callidinus is a species of sea snail, a marine gastropod mollusc in the family Muricidae, the murex snails or rock snails.

== Distribution ==
This marine species occurs from Guatemala to Costa Rica to off Puerto Pizarro, Tumbes Province, Peru.
