= Matapalo District =

Coordinates: 3.6824°S 80.1994°W

Matapalo
- District
- Interactive map of Matapalo
- Country: Peru
- Region: Tumbes
- Province: Zarumilla
- Founded: November 25, 1942
- Capital: Matapalo

Government
  - Mayor: Juan Miguel Feijoo Navarrete

Area
  - Total: 392.29 km^{2} (151.46 sq mi)
- Elevation: 54 m (177 ft)

Population (2005 census)
  - Total: 1,307
  - Density: 3.332/km^{2} (8.629/sq mi)
- Time zone: UTC-5 (PET)
- UBIGEO: 240303

Matapalo District is one of the four districts of the province Zarumilla in Peru.
