= Regional Government of Tumbes =

Regional government in Peru

- Gobierno Regional de Tumbes

Regional Government overview
- Formed: January 1, 2003; 22 years ago
- Jurisdiction: Department of Tumbes
- Website: Government site

The Regional Government of Tumbes (Spanish: Gobierno Regional de Tumbes; GORE Tumbes) is the regional government that represents the Department of Tumbes. It is the body with legal identity in public law and its own assets, which is in charge of the administration of provinces of the department in Peru. Its purpose is the social, cultural and economic development of its constituency. It is based in the city of Tumbes.

== List of representatives ==
Governor	Political party	Period
Rosa Medina Feijoo	APRA	January 1, 2003–December 31, 2006
Wilmer Dios Benites	Movimiento Independiente Regional Faena	January 1, 2007–December 31, 2010
Gerardo Viñas Dioses	Luchemos por Tumbes	January 1, 2011–July 31, 2014
Orlando La Chira Pasache	Luchemos por Tumbes	July 31, 2014–December 31, 2014
Ricardo Flores Dioses	Reconstrucción con Obras: Mas Obras para un Tumbes Bello	January 1, 2015–December 31, 2018
Wilmer Dios Benites	Movimiento Independiente Regional Faena	January 1, 2019–December 31, 2022
Segismundo Cruces Ordinola	Alianza para el Progreso	January 1, 2023–Incumbent

== See also ==
- Regional Governments of Peru
- Department of Tumbes
