= La Cruz District =

La Cruz District may refer to:

- La Cruz District, Tumbes, in Tumbes province, Tumbes region, Peru
- La Cruz District, La Cruz, in La Cruz Canton, Guanacaste province, Costa Rica
