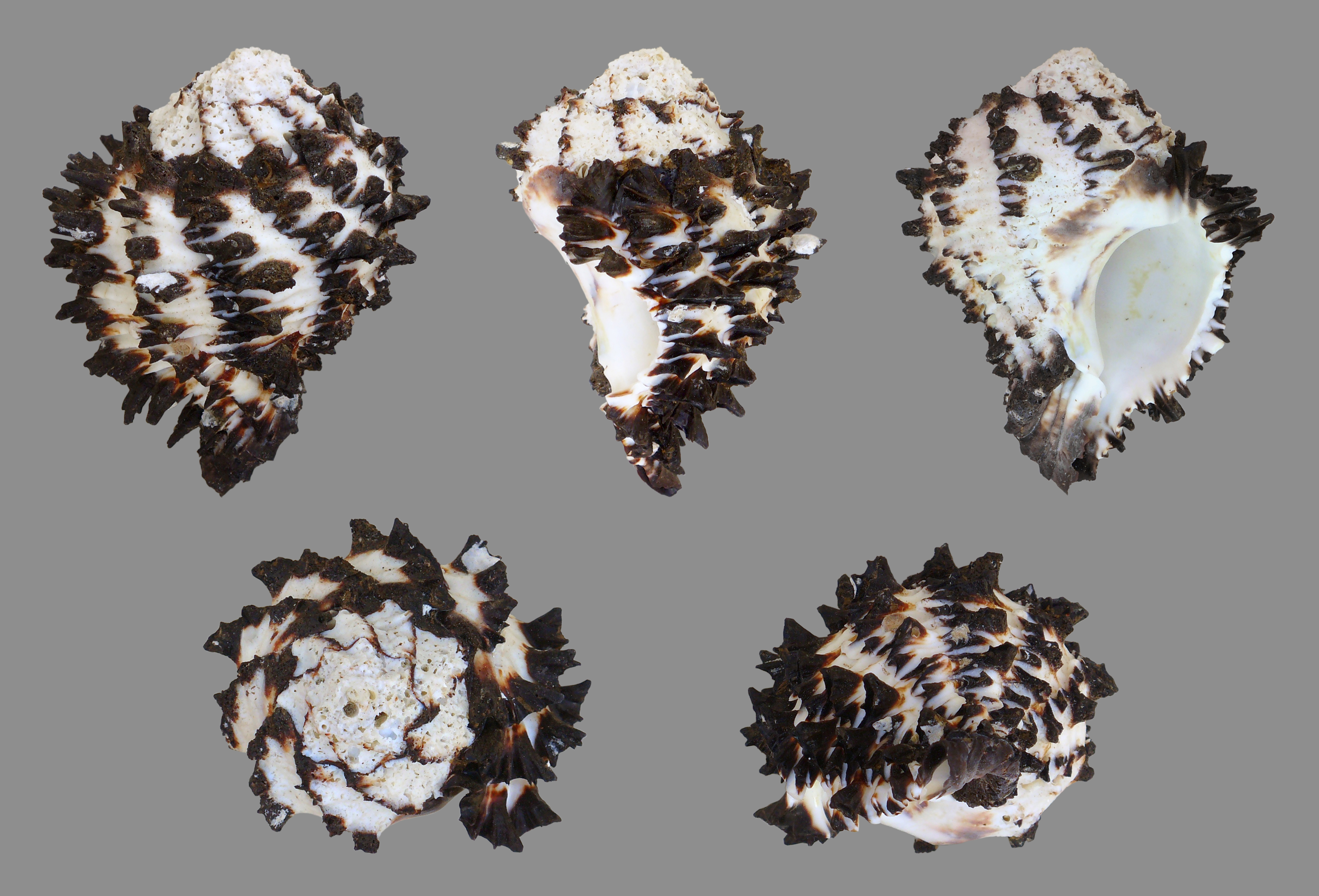
- Muricanthus radix

Scientific classification
- Kingdom: Animalia
- Phylum: Mollusca
- Class: Gastropoda
- Subclass: Caenogastropoda
- Order: Neogastropoda
- Family: Muricidae
- Subfamily: Muricinae
- Genus: Muricanthus; Swainson, 1840

Type species
- Murex radix Gmelin, 1791

Synonyms
- Aaronia Verrill, 1950; Centronotus Swainson, 1833; Hexaplex (Muricanthus) Swainson, 1840; Murex (Aaronia) A. H. Verrill, 1950; Murex (Centronotus) Swainson, 1833 (invalid: junior homonym of Centronotus Schneider, 1801 [Pisces]); Murex (Muricantha) P. Fischer, 1884 (unjustified emendation); Murex (Muricanthus) Swainson, 1840 (original rank)

= Muricanthus =

Genus of gastropods

Muricanthus is a genus of sea snails, marine gastropod mollusks in the family Muricidae, the murex snails or rock snails.

The name Muricanthus was previously considered a synonym of Hexaplex (Muricanthus) Swainson, 1840 represented as Hexaplex Perry, 1810

== Species ==
Species within the genus Muricanthus :

- Muricanthus ambiguus (Reeve, 1845)
- Muricanthus callidinus Berry, 1958
- Muricanthus nigritus (Philippi, 1845)
- Muricanthus radix (Gmelin, 1791)
- Muricanthus strausi (A. H. Verrill, 1950)

Species brought into synonymy

- Muricanthus kusterianus (Tapparone-Canefri, 1875): synonym of Hexaplex kuesterianus (Tapparone-Canefri, 1875)
- Muricanthus princeps (Broderip, 1833): synonym of Hexaplex princeps (Broderip, 1833)
- Muricanthus trippae Petuch, 1991: synonym of Hexaplex fulvescens (G.B. Sowerby II, 1834)
- Muricanthus varius (G.B. Sowerby I, 1834): synonym of Chicoreus varius (G.B. Sowerby II, 1834)
- Muricanthus virgineus (Röding, 1798): synonym of Chicoreus virgineus (Röding, 1798)
