= San Jacinto District =

Coordinates: 3.6422°S 80.4486°W

San Jacinto
- District
- Interactive map of San Jacinto
- Country: Peru
- Region: Tumbes
- Province: Tumbes
- Founded: November 24, 1955
- Capital: San Jacinto

Government
  - Mayor: José Luis Cornejo Feijoo

Area
  - Total: 598.72 km^{2} (231.17 sq mi)
- Elevation: 11 m (36 ft)

Population (2005 census)
  - Total: 8,070
  - Density: 13.5/km^{2} (34.9/sq mi)
- Time zone: UTC-5 (PET)
- UBIGEO: 240105

San Jacinto District is one of the six districts of the province Tumbes in Peru.
