= Decentralization in Peru =

Decentralization in Peru has long been a major issue in the government agenda.

A referendum was held on October 30, 2005, to decide whether fifteen of the current twenty-five regions will merge to form five new, larger regions. All citizens who are 18 or older and reside in the affected regions (7'234,321 persons) were entitled to vote.

Voters overwhelmingly opposed the merge, and therefore the regions will stay the way they currently are. Another referendum was scheduled for 2011 or 2012.

== Proposed regions ==
These are the new regions that were to be created if the voters had voted in favour of the merge:

1. Región Norte: Lambayeque, Piura, Tumbes
2. Región Nor Centro Oriente: Ancash, Huánuco, Junín, Lima, Pasco
3. Ica-Ayacucho-Huancavelica: Ayacucho, Huancavelica, Ica
4. Cusco-Apurímac: Apurímac, Cusco
5. Región Sur: Arequipa, Puno, Tacna

== See also ==
- Subdivisions of Peru
