= Puerto Pizarro =

Coordinates: 3.5020°S 80.3926°W

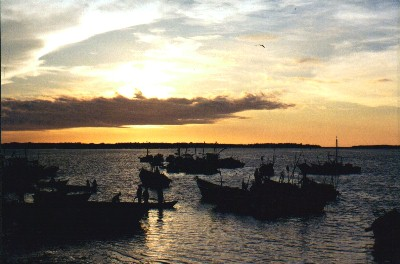
Sunset in the harbor.

Puerto Pizarro is a resort located thirteen miles from the city of Tumbes, Peru. Its inhabitants are mostly fishermen and seashell collectors.

== Attractions ==
Its shallow waters allow windsurfing, water skiing, and boating, making it a major tourist spot. Puerto Pizarro is the starting point to visit Tumbes Mangals National Sanctuary. Local guides are hired to bring tourists on boat trips to nearby islands, where you can see wildlife. Another point of interest is the Tumbes crocodile hatching place, where one can see all stages of the growth of this animal. This area is one of the remaining areas where the endangered Tumbes Crocodile can be seen.

== Climate ==
Climate data for Puerto Pizarro (1981–2010)
Month	Jan	Feb	Mar	Apr	May	Jun	Jul	Aug	Sep	Oct	Nov	Dec	Year
Mean daily maximum °C (°F)	31.1 (88.0)	31.6 (88.9)	31.7 (89.1)	31.4 (88.5)	30.4 (86.7)	28.8 (83.8)	27.8 (82.0)	27.2 (81.0)	27.5 (81.5)	28.2 (82.8)	28.9 (84.0)	30.1 (86.2)	29.6 (85.2)
Mean daily minimum °C (°F)	23.6 (74.5)	24.0 (75.2)	24.0 (75.2)	23.8 (74.8)	23.2 (73.8)	21.8 (71.2)	20.9 (69.6)	20.4 (68.7)	20.8 (69.4)	21.3 (70.3)	21.8 (71.2)	22.8 (73.0)	22.4 (72.2)
Average precipitation mm (inches)	59.2 (2.33)	131.4 (5.17)	107.3 (4.22)	72.9 (2.87)	32.6 (1.28)	11.7 (0.46)	5.9 (0.23)	0.3 (0.01)	0.9 (0.04)	1.8 (0.07)	6.9 (0.27)	33.1 (1.30)	464 (18.25)
Source: Senamhi
