= Zarumilla District =

Coordinates: 3.5006°S 80.2750°W

Zarumilla
- District
- Interactive map of Zarumilla
- Country: Peru
- Region: Tumbes
- Province: Zarumilla
- Founded: January 12, 1871
- Capital: Zarumilla

Government
  - Mayor: Felix Ernesto Garrido Rivera

Area
  - Total: 113.25 km^{2} (43.73 sq mi)
- Elevation: 11 m (36 ft)

Population (2005 census)
  - Total: 16,925
  - Density: 149.45/km^{2} (387.07/sq mi)
- Time zone: UTC-5 (PET)
- UBIGEO: 240301

Zarumilla District is one of the four districts of the province Zarumilla in Peru.
