= San Juan de la Virgen District =

Coordinates: 3.6275°S 80.4332°W

San Juan de la Virgen
- District
- Interactive map of San Juan de la Virgen
- Country: Peru
- Region: Tumbes
- Province: Tumbes
- Founded: January 12, 1871
- Capital: San Juan de la Virgen

Government
  - Mayor: Fernando Elias Cedillo Roque

Area
  - Total: 118.71 km^{2} (45.83 sq mi)
- Elevation: 40 m (130 ft)

Population (2005 census)
  - Total: 3,780
  - Density: 31.8/km^{2} (82.5/sq mi)
- Time zone: UTC-5 (PET)
- UBIGEO: 240106

San Juan de la Virgen District is one of the six districts of the province Tumbes in Peru.
