= Tumbes province =

Province in Tumbes, Peru

Tumbes
- Province
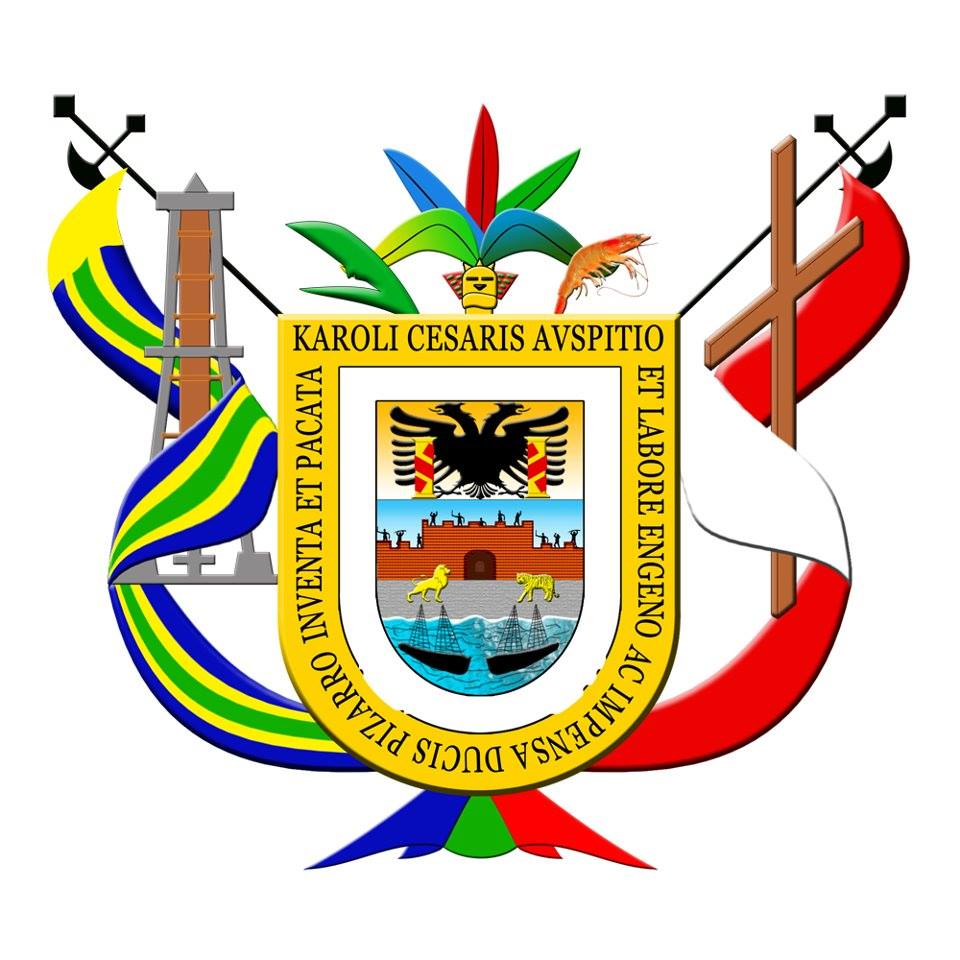
- Flag Coat of arms

- Location of Tumbes in the Tumbes Region
- Coordinates: 3°34′00″S 80°27′00″W
- Country: Peru
- Region: Tumbes
- Capital: Tumbes

Government
  - Mayor: Carlos Jimy Silva Mena

Area
  - Total: 1,800.85 km^{2} (695.31 sq mi)
- Elevation: 7 m (23 ft)

Population
  - Total: 154,962
  - Density: 86.0494/km^{2} (222.867/sq mi)
- UBIGEO: 2401
- Website: www.munitumbes.gob.pe

Tumbes is a province in Peru, located in the region of the same name. It borders the Pacific Ocean on the north, the province of Zarumilla on the east, the Piura Region and Ecuador on the south and the province of Contralmirante Villar on the west. Its capital is Tumbes, which is also the regional capital.

== Boundaries ==
- North: Pacific Ocean
- East: Zarumilla province
- South: Piura Region and Ecuador
- West: Contralmirante Villar province

== Political division ==
The province is divided into six districts (Spanish: distritos, singular: distrito):

- Tumbes
- Corrales
- La Cruz
- Pampas de Hospital
- San Jacinto
- San Juan de la Virgen
