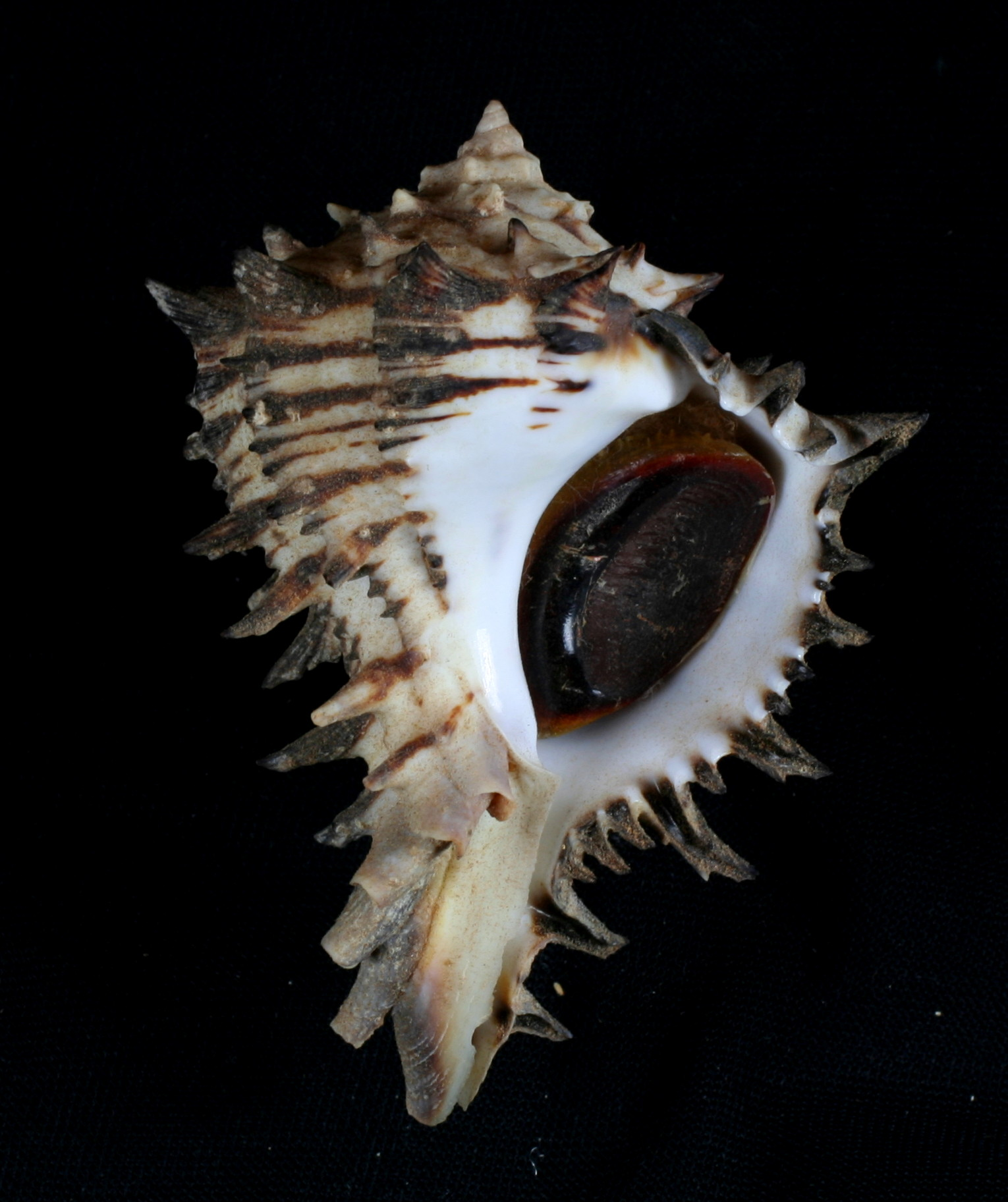
- Shell of Muricanthus nigritus (Philippi, 1845), and operculum measuring 78.7 mm in height, from Concepcion Bay, in Mexico.

Scientific classification
- Kingdom: Animalia
- Phylum: Mollusca
- Class: Gastropoda
- Subclass: Caenogastropoda
- Order: Neogastropoda
- Family: Muricidae
- Subfamily: Muricinae
- Genus: Muricanthus
- Species: M. nigritus

Binomial name
- Muricanthus nigritus (Philippi, 1845)

Synonyms
- Hexaplex (Muricanthus) nigritus (Philippi, 1845); Hexaplex nigritus (Philippi, 1845); Murex (Phyllonotus) melanoleuca Mörch, 1852 (uncesserary substitute name for Murex nigrita); Murex melanoleuca Mørch, 1852; Murex nigrita sensu Meuschen Mørch, 1852 (original spelling, incorrect gender ); Murex nigritus Philippi, 1845 (basionym)

= Muricanthus nigritus =

Species of gastropod

Muricanthus nigritus, the Northern Radix or Black-and-White Murex or Black Murex, is a species of sea snail, a marine gastropod mollusc in the family Muricidae, the murex snails or rock snails. It is commonly known as the black murex shell.

== Distribution ==
The black murex shell is commonly found in the Gulf of California (Sea of Cortez), in the Western Mexico.

== Habitat ==
These sea snails can be found in the intertidal and subtidal waters, with sand and gravel substrate, at depths up to 60 m.

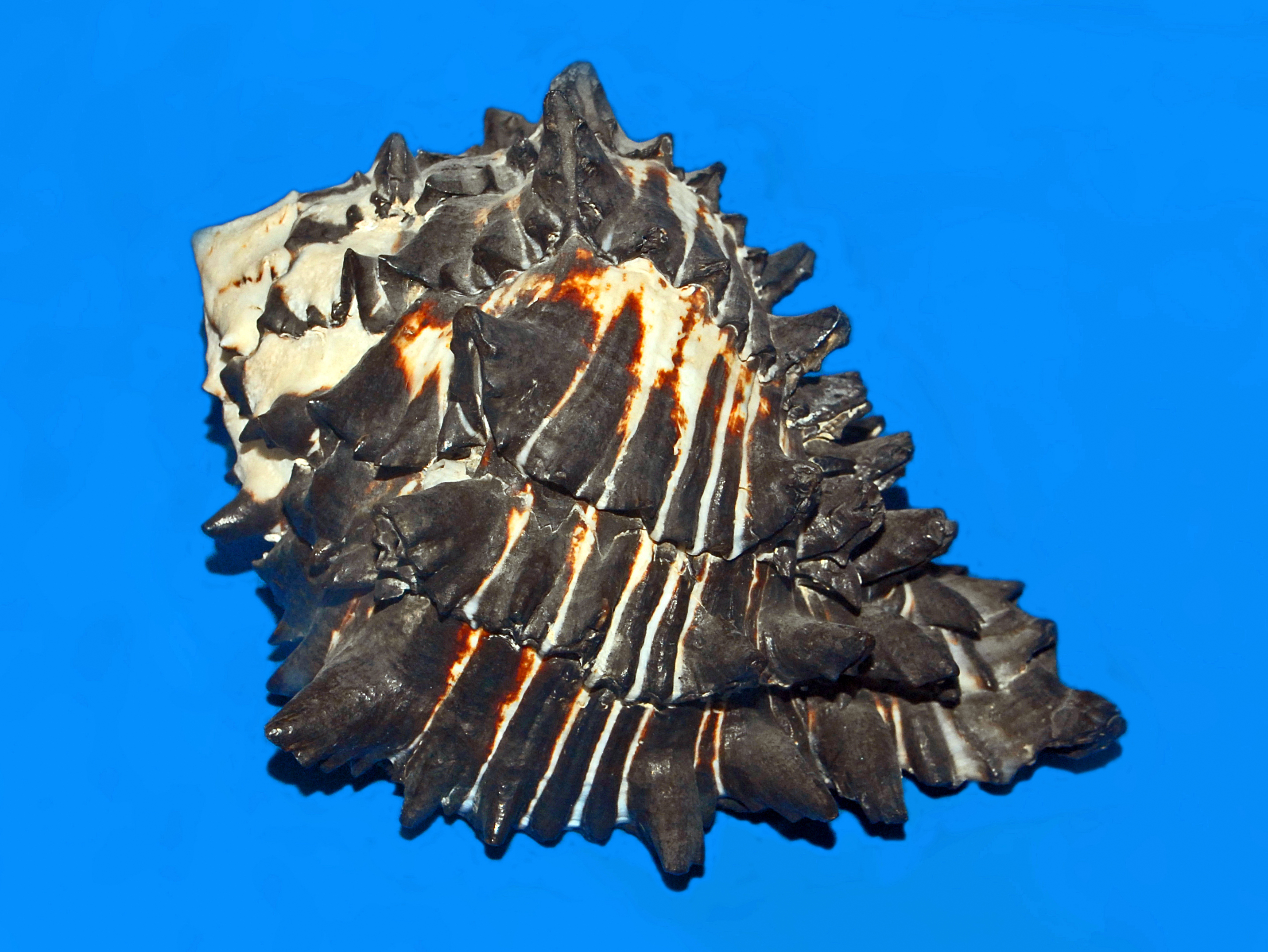
A shell of Hexaplex nigritus from Gulf of California, on display at the Museo Civico di Storia Naturale di Milano

== Description ==
Shells of Muricanthus nigritus can reach a length of 75–200 millimetres (3.0–7.9 in). These large shells are black and white with black or dark brown stripes. The shell surface bears short spikes around the body whorl and spire. The aperture is porcelaneous white.

This species is quite similar to Hexaplex radix. The shells of these two species mainly differ in the length, width and in the proportion of black versus white. Moreover, shells of H. nigritus are more oblong and show more spines in black.

== Biology ==
These sea snails feed primarily on clams.

== Bibliography ==
- A. P. H. Oliver, James Nicholls - Hamlyn Guide to Shells of the World
- Angeline Myra Keen - Sea Shells of Tropical West America
- B. Garrigues, J-P. Pointier D. Merle - Fossil and Recent Muricidae of the World
- Jerome M. Eisenberg - Collector's guide to Seashells of the World
- Merle D., Garrigues B. & Pointier J.-P. (2011) Fossil and Recent Muricidae of the world. Part Muricinae. Hackenheim: Conchbooks. 648 pp.
- Houart, R. & Wiedrick, S.G. (2021). Review of Muricanthus Swainson, 1840 and some Recent species assigned to Hexaplex s.s. Perry, 1810, Hexaplex (Trunculariopsis) Cossmann, 1921 and Phyllonotus Swainson, 1833. Novapex. 22(1-2): 25–42.
