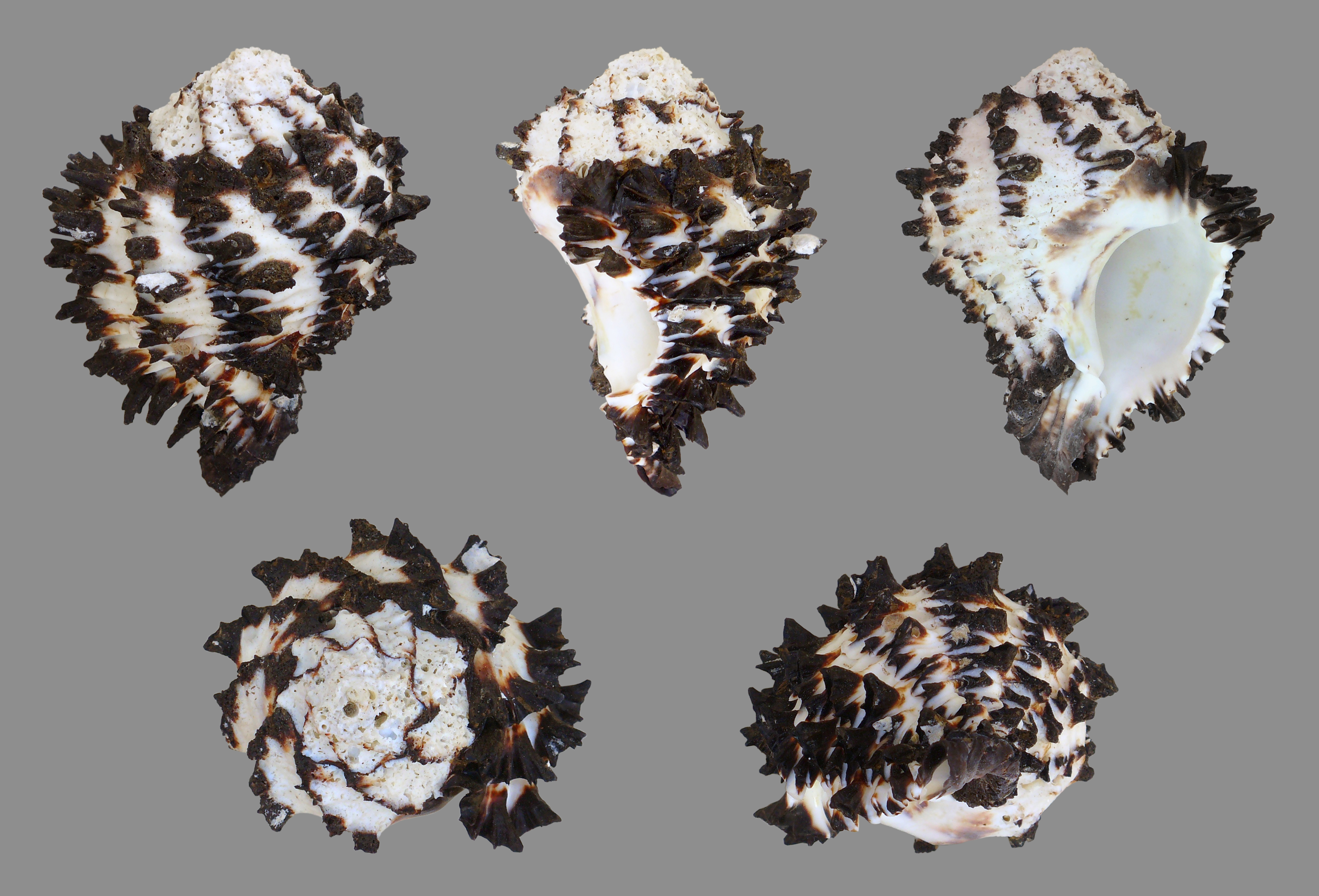
- Five views of a shell of Muricanthus radix

Scientific classification
- Kingdom: Animalia
- Phylum: Mollusca
- Class: Gastropoda
- Subclass: Caenogastropoda
- Order: Neogastropoda
- Family: Muricidae
- Subfamily: Muricinae
- Genus: Muricanthus
- Species: M. radix

Binomial name
- Muricanthus radix (Gmelin, 1791)

Synonyms
- Hexaplex (Muricanthus) radix (Gmelin, 1791); Hexaplex radix (Gmelin, 1791); Murex radix Gmelin, 1791 (basionym); Murex strausi Verrill, 1950

= Muricanthus radix =

Species of gastropod

Muricanthus radix, the radix murex or root murex, is a species of sea snail, a marine gastropod mollusk in the family Muricidae, the murex snails or rock snails.

== Distribution ==
This species can be found in the western Pacific in parts of Central America (Baja California, from Mexico to Peru).

== Habitat ==
These sea snails live along the tropical coasts in shallow waters among intertidal rocks.

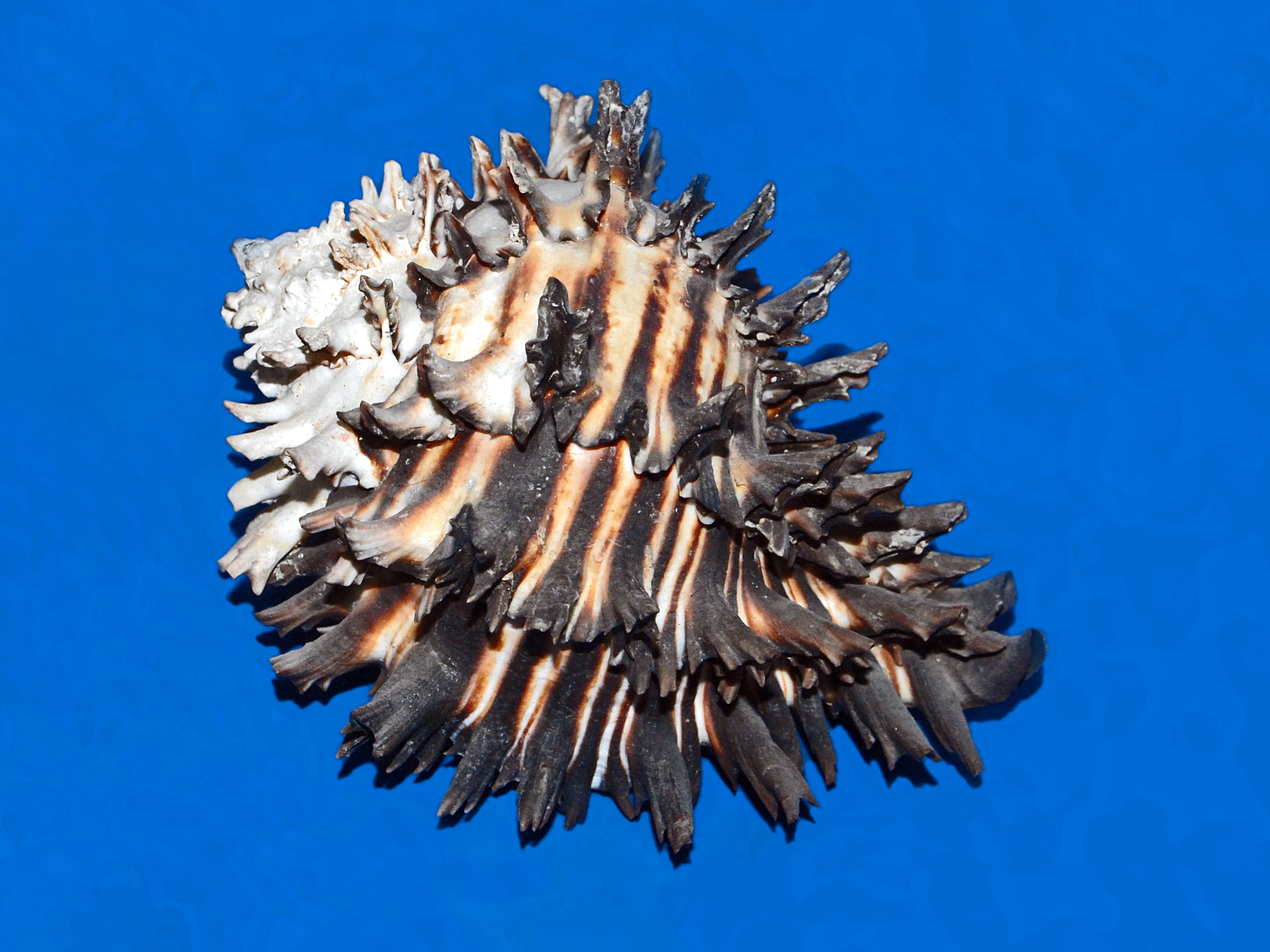
A shell of Muricanthus radix from Panama on display at the Museo Civico di Storia Naturale di Milano

== Description ==
Shells of Muricanthus radix can reach a size of 50–160 millimetres (2.0–6.3 in). These large, massive, heavy shells are globose or pear-shaped and very spiny, with a white surface and blackish-brown foliations and spiral elements. The body whorls have six to eleven varices. The aperture is large, broad, ovate and porcelaneous white. The outer edges are strongly dentate. The siphonal canal is moderately long. The operculum is dark brown.

This species is quite similar to Hexaplex nigritus. The shells of these two species mainly differ in the length, width and in the proportion of blackish-brown versus white. Moreover, shells of H. radix are less oblong and show less spines in black.

== Biology ==
Hexaplex radix feeds primarily on clams.

== Bibliography ==
- A. Keen - Sea Shells of Tropical West America
- Arianna Fulvo and Roberto Nistri (2005). 350 coquillages du monde entier. Delachaux et Niestlé (Paris) : 256 p. (ISBN 2-603-01374-2)
- G. E. Radwin - Murex Shells of the World - An Illustrated Guide to the Muricidae
- Merle D., Garrigues B. & Pointier J.-P. (2011) Fossil and Recent Muricidae of the world. Part Muricinae. Hackenheim: Conchbooks. 648 pp.
- Pfleger V. (1999): České názvy živočichů III. Měkkýši (Mollusca) - Národní muzeum, Praha, 108 pp.
- V. Alamo and V. Valdivieso M. - Systematic List of Peruvian Marine Molluscs
- Houart, R. & Wiedrick, S.G. (2021). Review of Muricanthus Swainson, 1840 and some Recent species assigned to Hexaplex s.s. Perry, 1810, Hexaplex (Trunculariopsis) Cossmann, 1921 and Phyllonotus Swainson, 1833. Novapex. 22(1-2): 25-42.
