= La Cruz District, Tumbes =

Coordinates: 3.6370°S 80.5894°W

La Cruz
- District
- Interactive map of La Cruz
- Country: Peru
- Region: Tumbes
- Province: Tumbes
- Founded: June 18, 1962
- Capital: Caleta Cruz

Government
  - Mayor: José Alipio Davis Atoche

Area
  - Total: 65.23 km^{2} (25.19 sq mi)
- Elevation: 5 m (16 ft)

Population (2005 census)
  - Total: 8,092
  - Density: 124.1/km^{2} (321.3/sq mi)
- Time zone: UTC-5 (PET)
- UBIGEO: 240103

La Cruz District is one of the six districts of the province Tumbes in Peru.
