= Papayal District =

Coordinates: 3.5714°S 80.2346°W

Papayal
- District
- Interactive map of Papayal
- Country: Peru
- Region: Tumbes
- Province: Zarumilla
- Founded: November 25, 1942
- Capital: Papayal

Government
  - Mayor: Edwin Ruben Rivas Garcia

Area
  - Total: 193.53 km^{2} (74.72 sq mi)
- Elevation: 60 m (200 ft)

Population (2005 census)
  - Total: 4,805
  - Density: 24.83/km^{2} (64.30/sq mi)
- Time zone: UTC-5 (PET)
- UBIGEO: 240304

Papayal District is one of the four districts of the province Zarumilla in Peru.
