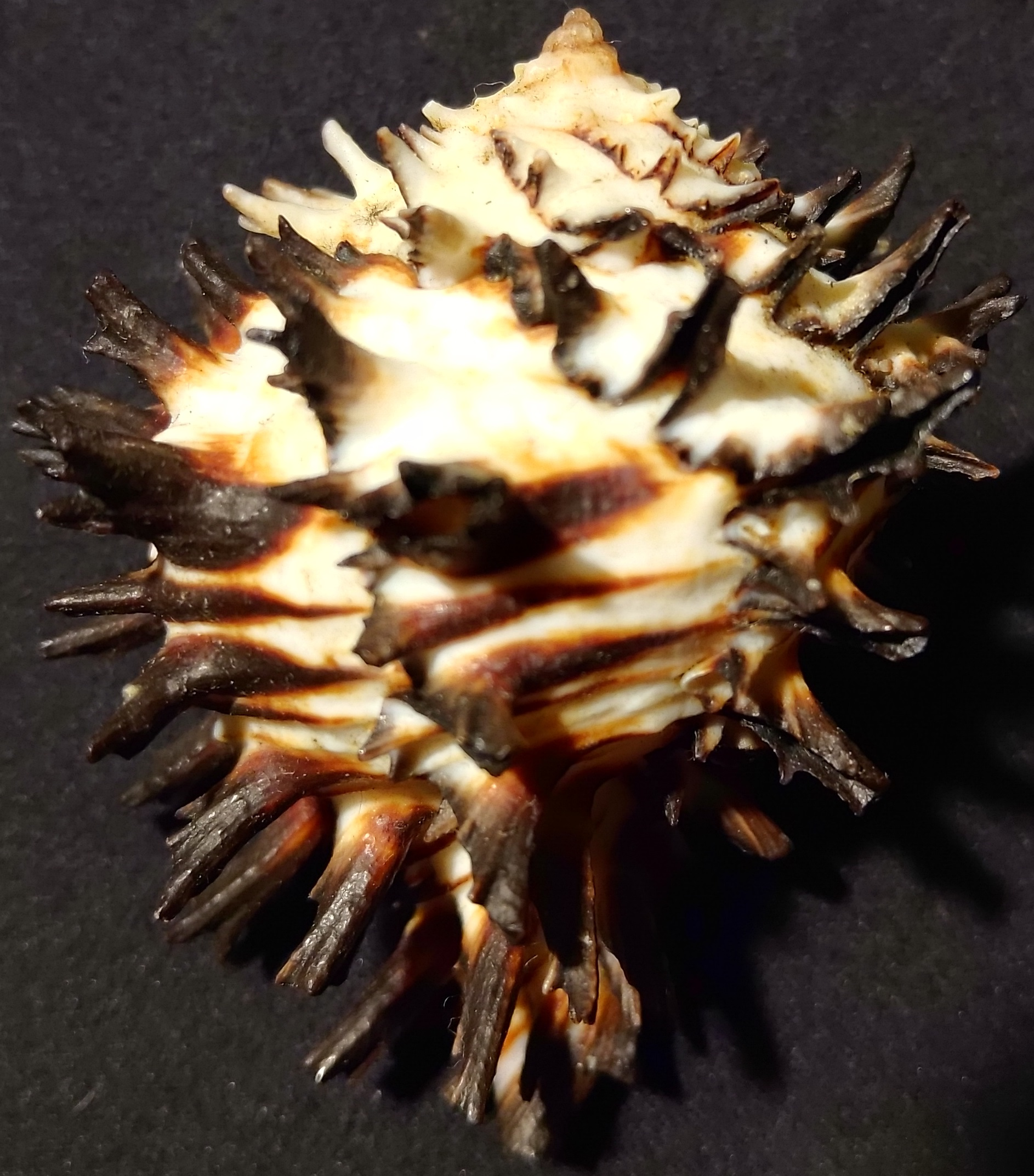
- Shell and operculum, 98.5 mm high

Scientific classification
- Kingdom: Animalia
- Phylum: Mollusca
- Class: Gastropoda
- Subclass: Caenogastropoda
- Order: Neogastropoda
- Family: Muricidae
- Genus: Muricanthus
- Species: M. ambiguus

Binomial name
- Muricanthus ambiguus (Reeve, 1845)

Synonyms
- Hexaplex (Muricanthus) ambiguus (Reeve, 1845); Hexaplex ambiguus (Reeve, 1845); Murex ambiguus Reeve, 1845; Murex melanoleuca Mørch, 1852; Muricanthus ambiguus (Reeve, 1845)

= Muricanthus ambiguus =

Species of gastropod

Muricanthus ambiguus is a species of sea snail, a marine gastropod mollusc in the family Muricidae, the murex snails or rock snails.

== Distribution ==
This marine species occurs in the Central and southern Gulf of California to the Pearl Islands, Panama.
