= Corrales District =

Coordinates: 3.6010°S 80.4807°W

Corrales
- District
- Interactive map of Corrales
- Country: Peru
- Region: Tumbes
- Province: Tumbes
- Founded: January 12, 1871
- Capital: San Pedro de los Incas

Government
  - Mayor: Carmen Chiroque Paico

Area
  - Total: 131.6 km^{2} (50.8 sq mi)
- Elevation: 12 m (39 ft)

Population (2005 census)
  - Total: 20,377
  - Density: 154.8/km^{2} (401.0/sq mi)
- Time zone: UTC-5 (PET)
- UBIGEO: 240102

Corrales District is one of the six districts of the province Tumbes in Peru.
