= Zarumilla River =

River in Peru and Ecuador

Zarumila River
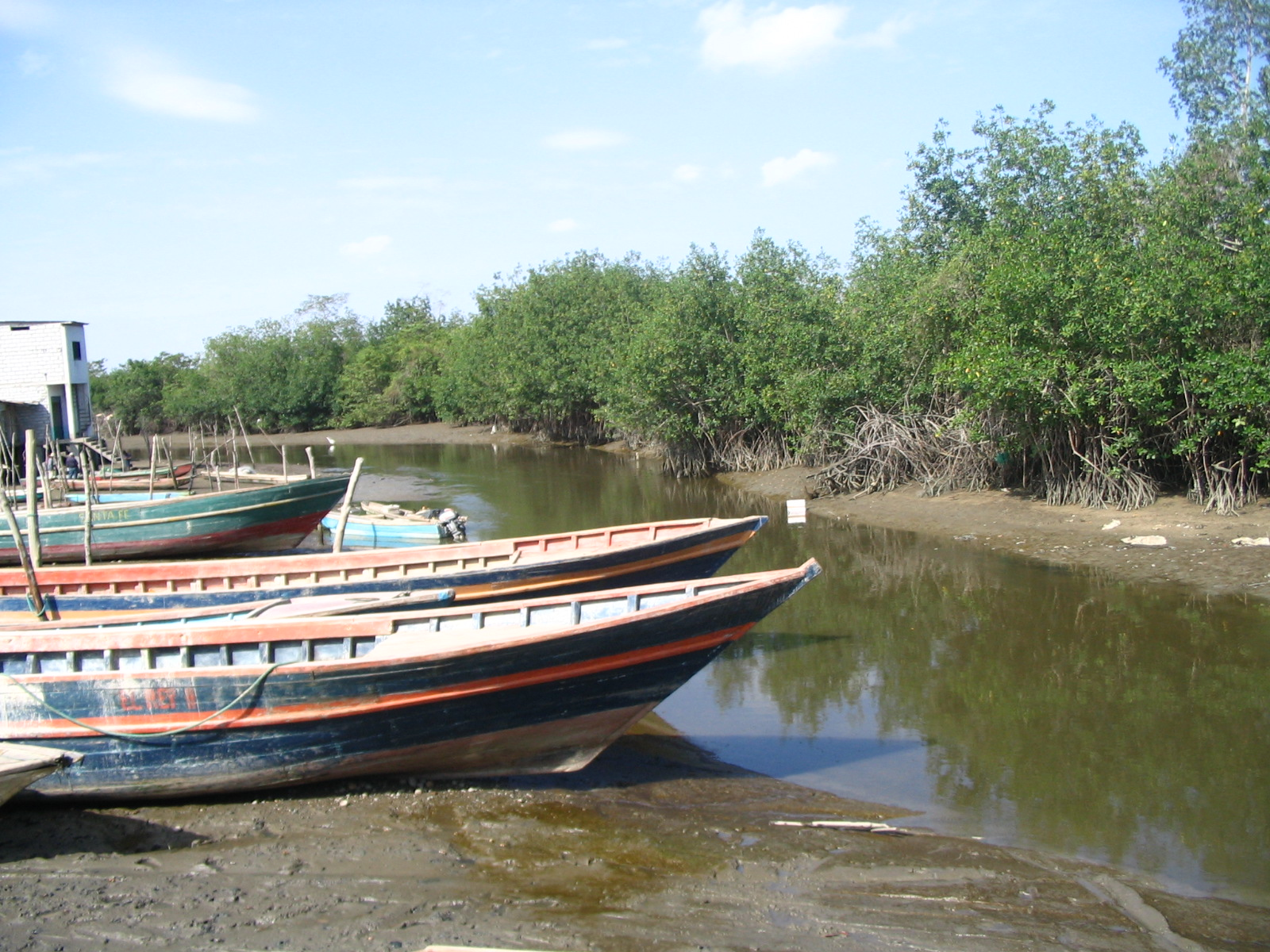

- Location of mouth

Location
- Countries: Peru, Ecuador

Physical characteristics
- Mouth
  - coordinates: 3.4408°S 80.2219°W

The Zarumilla River is a river in South America that marks the border between Peru and Ecuador. It is named after the Peruvian town of Zarumilla.

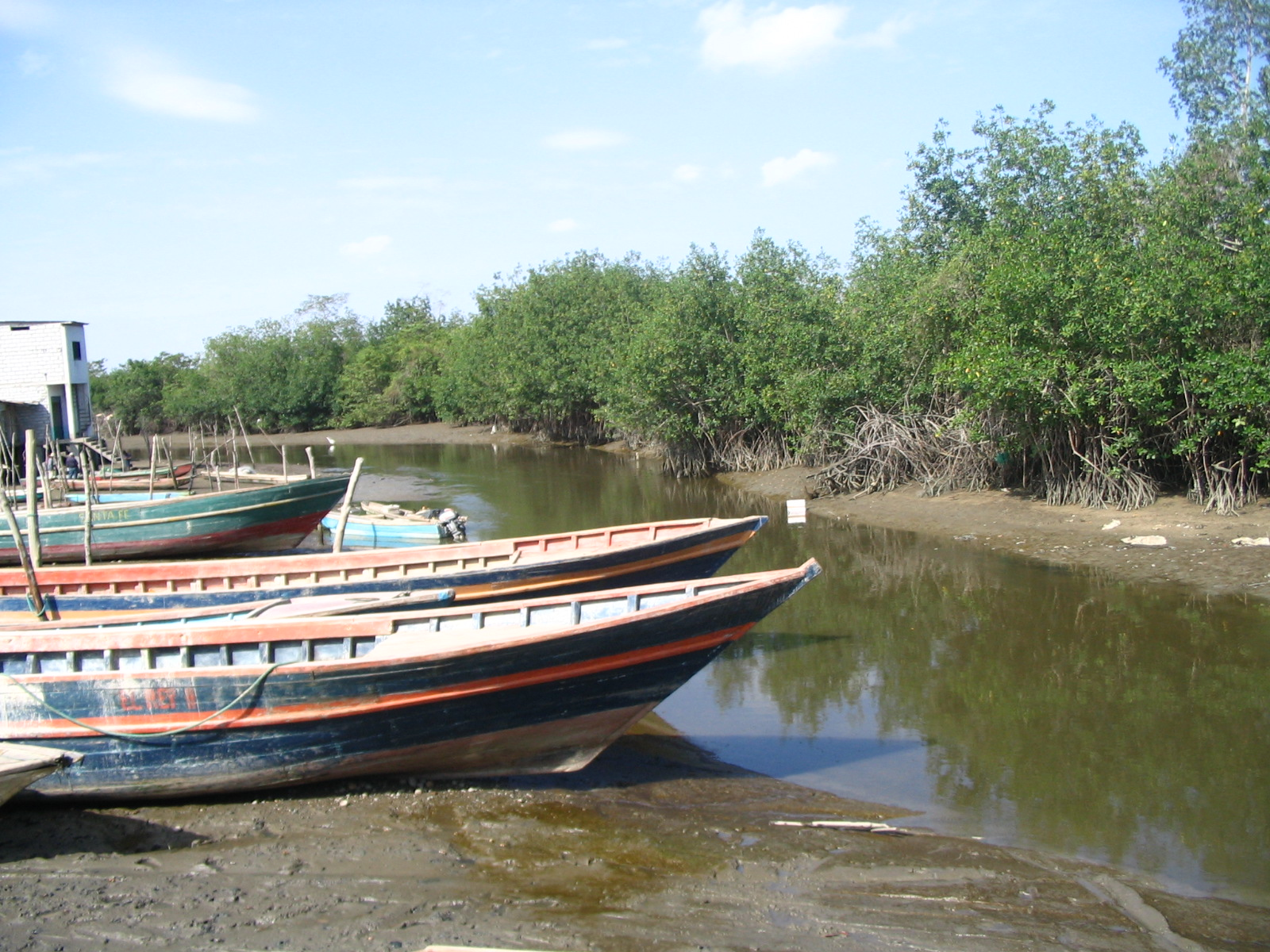
View of the river; the boats are on Ecuadorian territory, while the Peruvian side of the border (to the right) is uninhabited

It is part of the Gulf of Guayaquil-Tumbes mangroves Sanctuary and its currents, sediments, and tides strongly influence the geomorphology of the area. It empties into the Gulf of Guayaquil.

The largest towns on its banks are Huaquillas, in the Ecuadorian province of El Oro, and Aguas Verdes in the Tumbes Region of Peru; both towns are connected by an international bridge. The water flows through a canal as the river passes these populated areas. Pollution is a problem in this part of the river, as people from both countries discharge their waste into the canal.

== Border issues ==
In 1998, during El Niño, the river changed its course, moving 1 square kilometre of land into its eastern margin. Ecuadorians took advantage of this situation, saying that the river is the natural border marker and therefore gives them rights in the affected area. The Peruvians argued that the area is sovereign Peruvian soil.

View of Zarumilla River from international bridge linking Ecuador and Peru in Huaquillas
