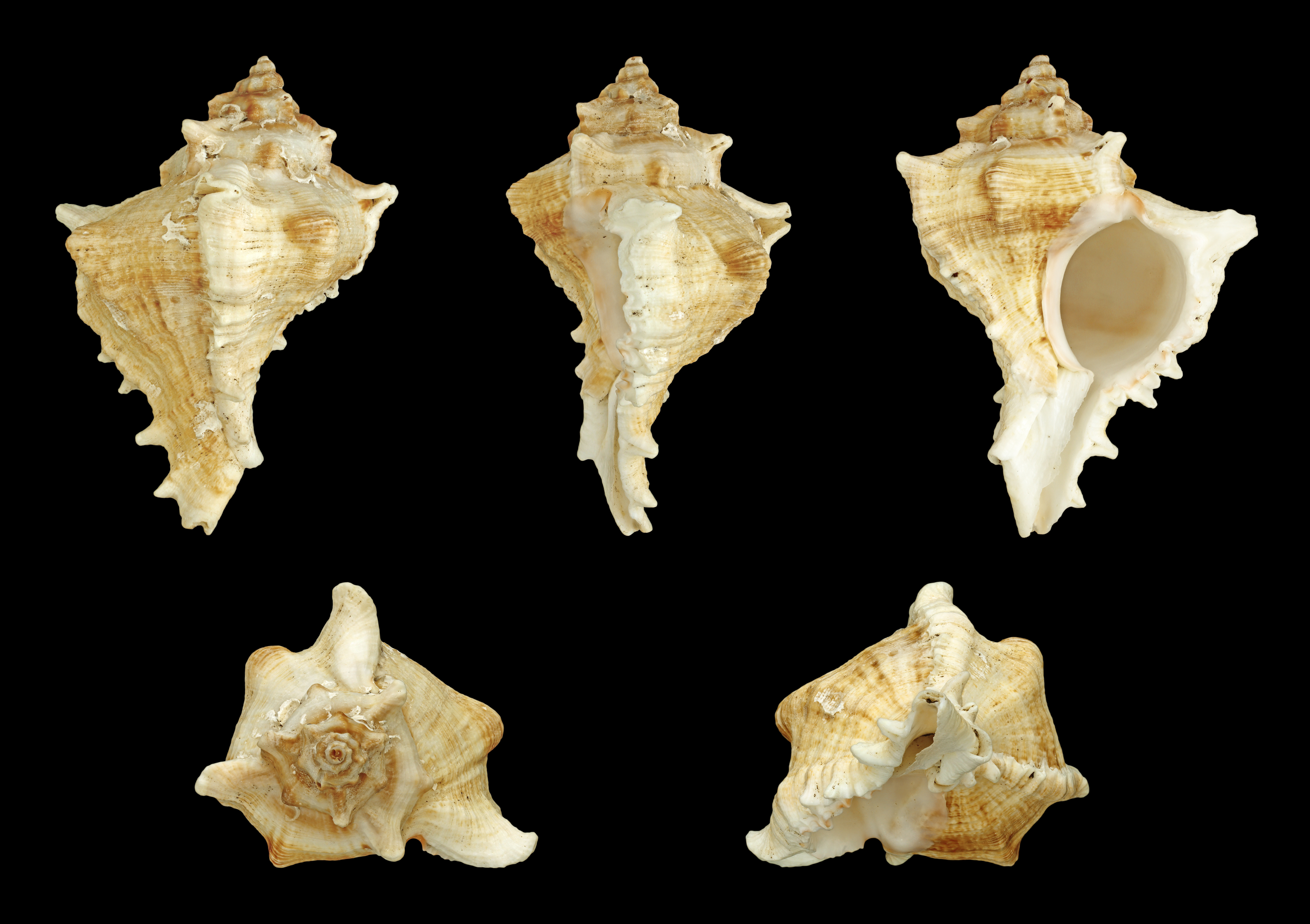
- Chicoreus virgineus (Röding, 1798)

Scientific classification
- Kingdom: Animalia
- Phylum: Mollusca
- Class: Gastropoda
- Subclass: Caenogastropoda
- Order: Neogastropoda
- Family: Muricidae
- Genus: Chicoreus
- Species: C. virgineus

Binomial name
- Chicoreus virgineus (Röding, 1798)

Synonyms
- Chicoreus (Chicoreus) virgineus (Röding, 1798); Murex anguliferus Lamarck, 1822; Murex cyacantha Sowerby, 1879; Murex erythraeus Fischer, 1870; Murex ferrugo Wood, 1828; Murex ponderosus Sowerby, 1879; Murex tricostatus Fischer von Waldheim, 1807; Murex virgineus (Röding, 1798); Murex virgineus var. ponderosa G. B. Sowerby II, 1879; Muricanthus virgineus (Röding, 1798); Purpura rudis Link, 1807; Purpura virgineus Röding, 1798

= Chicoreus virgineus =

Species of gastropod

Chicoreus virgineus, common name the virgin murex, is a species of sea snail, a marine gastropod mollusk in the family Muricidae, the murex snails or rock snails.

== Description ==
The size of an adult shell varies between 60 mm and 160 mm.

== Distribution ==
This species occurs from the Red Sea to the Bay of Bengal.

== Subspecies ==
Chicoreus Virgineus Ponderosus (var) Sowerby 1879
