= Zarumilla province =

Coordinates: 3.5020°S 80.2730°W

Zarumilla
- Province
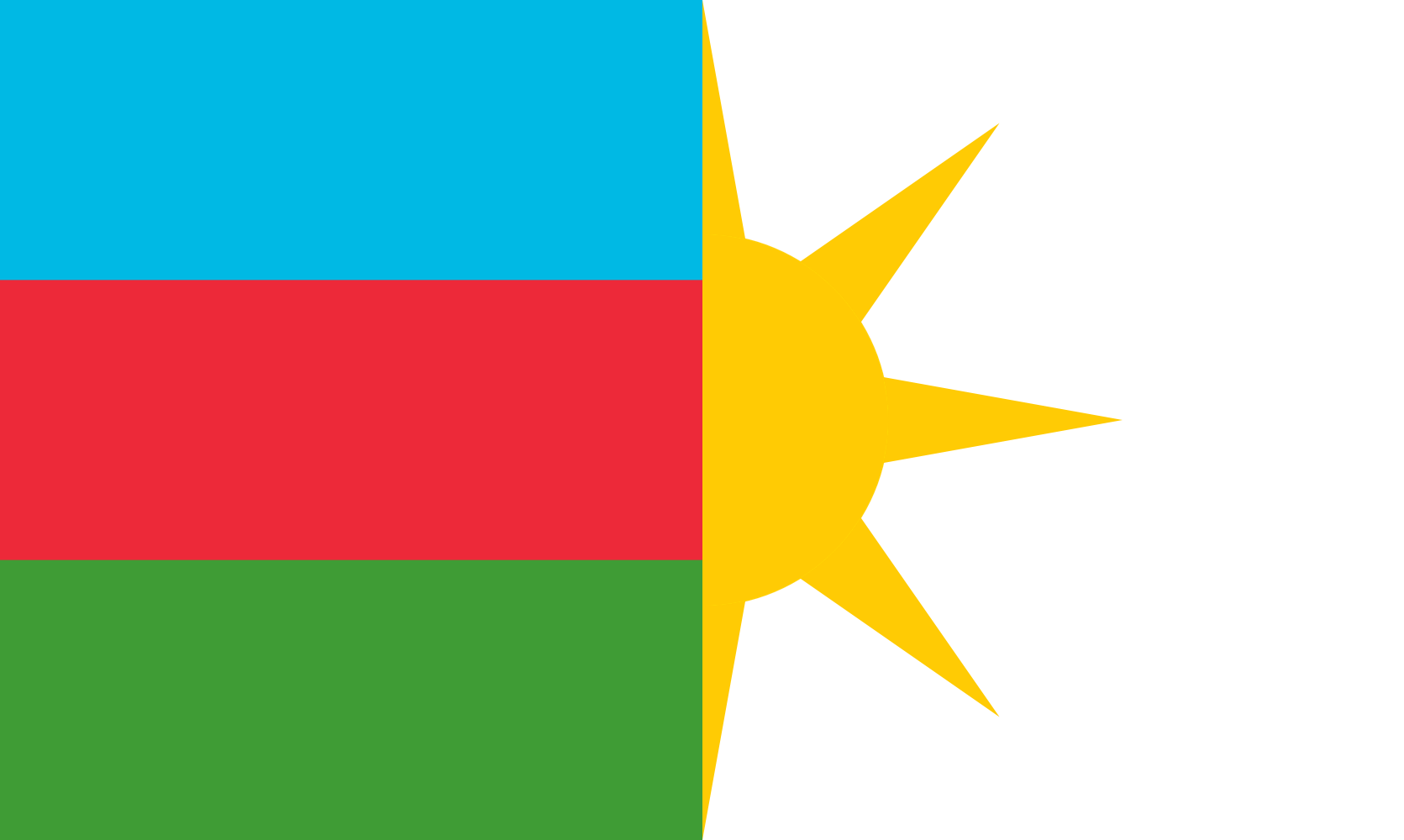
- Flag

- Location of Zarumilla in the Tumbes Region
- Country: Peru
- Region: Tumbes
- Founded: November 17, 1942
- Capital: Zarumilla

Government
  - Mayor: Felix Ernesto Garrido Rivera

Area
  - Total: 745.13 km^{2} (287.70 sq mi)
- Elevation: 11 m (36 ft)

Population
  - Total: 36,669
  - Density: 49.212/km^{2} (127.46/sq mi)
- UBIGEO: 2403

Zarumilla is one of the three provinces of the Tumbes Region in northwestern Peru. It borders the Pacific Ocean on the north, Ecuador on the south and east, and the Tumbes Province on the west.

Its capital is the town of Zarumilla. Other important settlements in the province include Matapalo and the border town of Aguas Verdes, which is connected to Ecuador by a bridge.

Zarumilla was established as a province on November 17, 1942.

The Zarumilla River, located in the eastern part of the province, marks the border between Peru and Ecuador. In 1998, during El Niño, the river changed its course, moving 1 square kilometre (250 acres) of land into its eastern margin. Ecuadorians took advantage of this situation, saying that the river is the natural border marker and therefore gives them rights in the affected area. The Peruvians argued that the area is sovereign Peruvian soil.

== Boundaries ==
- North: Pacific Ocean and Ecuador
- East: Ecuador
- South: Ecuador and province of Tumbes
- West: province of Tumbes

== Political division ==
The province is divided into four districts (Spanish: distritos, singular: distrito):

- Matapalo
- Papayal
- Zarumilla
- Aguas Verdes

== See also ==
- History of the Ecuadorian-Peruvian territorial dispute
