= Huaquillas =

Border town in Ecuador

- City
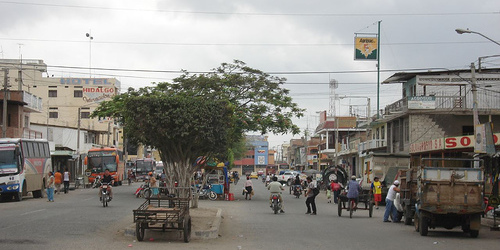
- Downtown of Huaquillas

- Flag
- Nickname: Huaquillas, ciudad binacional (Huaquillas, binational city)
- Motto: Centinela sin relevo (Sentinel without relief)
- Location within Ecuador
- Coordinates: 3.47504°S 80.21829°W
- Country: Ecuador
- Provinces: El Oro
- Canton: Huaquillas

Government
  - Mayor: Florencio Farez

Area
  - City: 17.86 km^{2} (6.90 sq mi)
- Elevation: 10 m (33 ft)

Population (2022 census)
  - City: 56,021
  - Density: 3,137/km^{2} (8,124/sq mi)
- Demonym: Huaquillense
- Time zone: UTC-5 (ECT)
- Website: http://www.huaquillas.gob.ec/

Huaquillas (Spanish pronunciation: [wa.'ki.ʝas]) is a border town in western El Oro, Ecuador. It is the canton seat of the Huaquillas Canton.

Huaquillas is located on the border with Peru. An international bridge that goes over the Zarumilla River connects it with the Peruvian town of Aguas Verdes. Both towns have an intense commercial life and many formal, as well as informal street sellers that sell goods both in US dollars, the only currency in Ecuador, and in Peruvian soles.

The town was occupied by Peru during the 1941 Ecuadorian–Peruvian War.

View of Zarumilla River from international bridge linking Ecuador and Peru in Huaquillas.
