= Zarumilla =

City in Tumbes, Peru

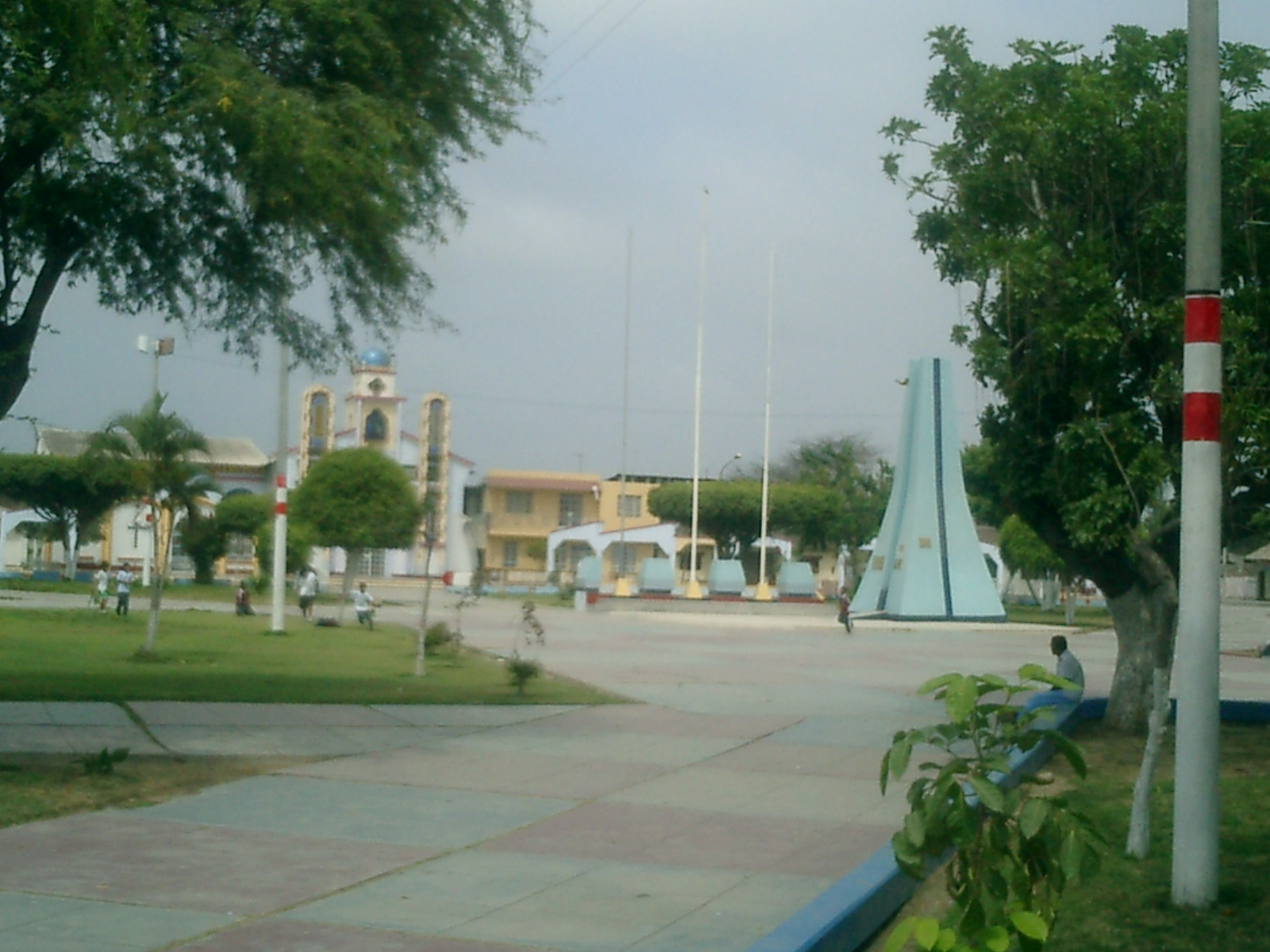
- Main square in Zarumilla

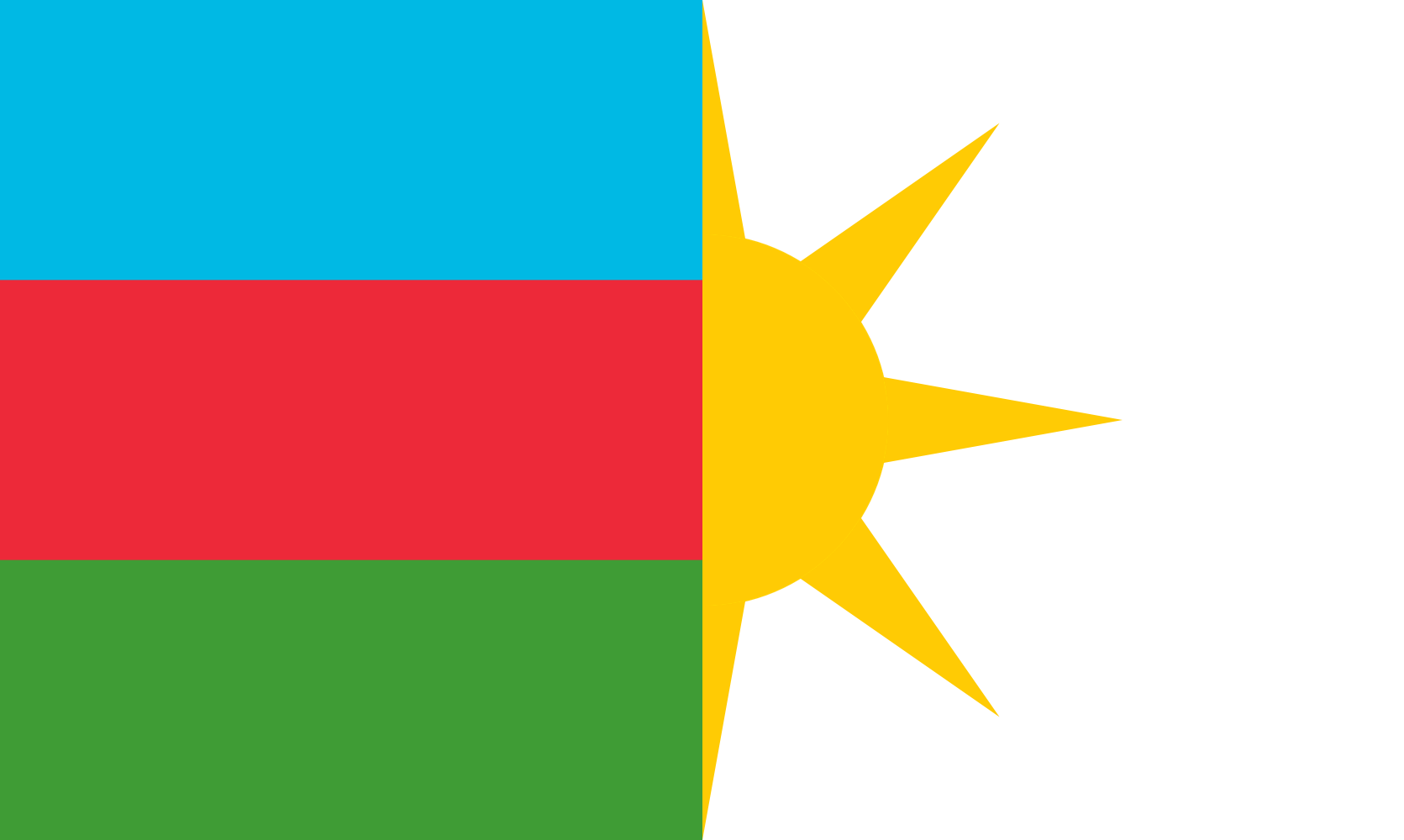
- Flag
- Nicknames: Centinela arrogante del Perú (Arrogant Sentinel of Peru), Gloriosa y victoriosa (Glorious and Victorious)
- Location within Peru
- Country: Peru
- Department: Tumbes
- Province: Zarumilla
- District: Zarumilla
- Founded: January 12, 1871

Government
  - Mayor: Felix Ernesto Garrido Rivera

Area
  - Total: 113.25 km^{2} (43.73 sq mi)
- Elevation: 11 m (36 ft)

Population (2019)
  - Total: 54,625
- Demonym(s): Zarumillano, -na
- Time zone: UTC-5 (PET)
- Website: https://munizarumilla.gob.pe/

Zarumilla is a city in the Tumbes Region, in northwestern Peru. It has a population of 54,625 as of 2019, and is the capital of the Zarumilla Province. It is also the main settlement in the Zarumilla District. It is located only a few kilometers away from the border town of Aguas Verdes, which is connected to Ecuador by a bridge.

The city's surroundings were the location of the eponymous battle that took place from July 23 to 31 during the 1941 Ecuadorian–Peruvian War. Its economy is focused on farming and the city serves today as a route of international trade with Ecuador.
