= Huaquillas Canton =

- Canton
- Location of El Oro Province in Ecuador.

- Huaquillas Canton in El Oro Province
- Coordinates: 3.48138°S 80.243207°W
- Country: Ecuador
- Province: El Oro Province

Area
  - Total: 98.53 km^{2} (38.04 sq mi)

Population (2022 census)
  - Total: 56,303
  - Density: 571.4/km^{2} (1,480/sq mi)
- Time zone: UTC-5 (ECT)

Huaquillas Canton is a canton of Ecuador, located in the El Oro Province. Its capital is the town of Huaquillas. Its population at the 2001 census was 40,285.

== Demographics ==
Ethnic groups as of the Ecuadorian census of 2010:

- Mestizo 82.3%
- White 7.0%
- Afro-Ecuadorian 6.5%
- Montubio 3.6%
- Indigenous 0.5%
- Other 0.2%
