= Tumbes, Peru =

Tumbes
- Town
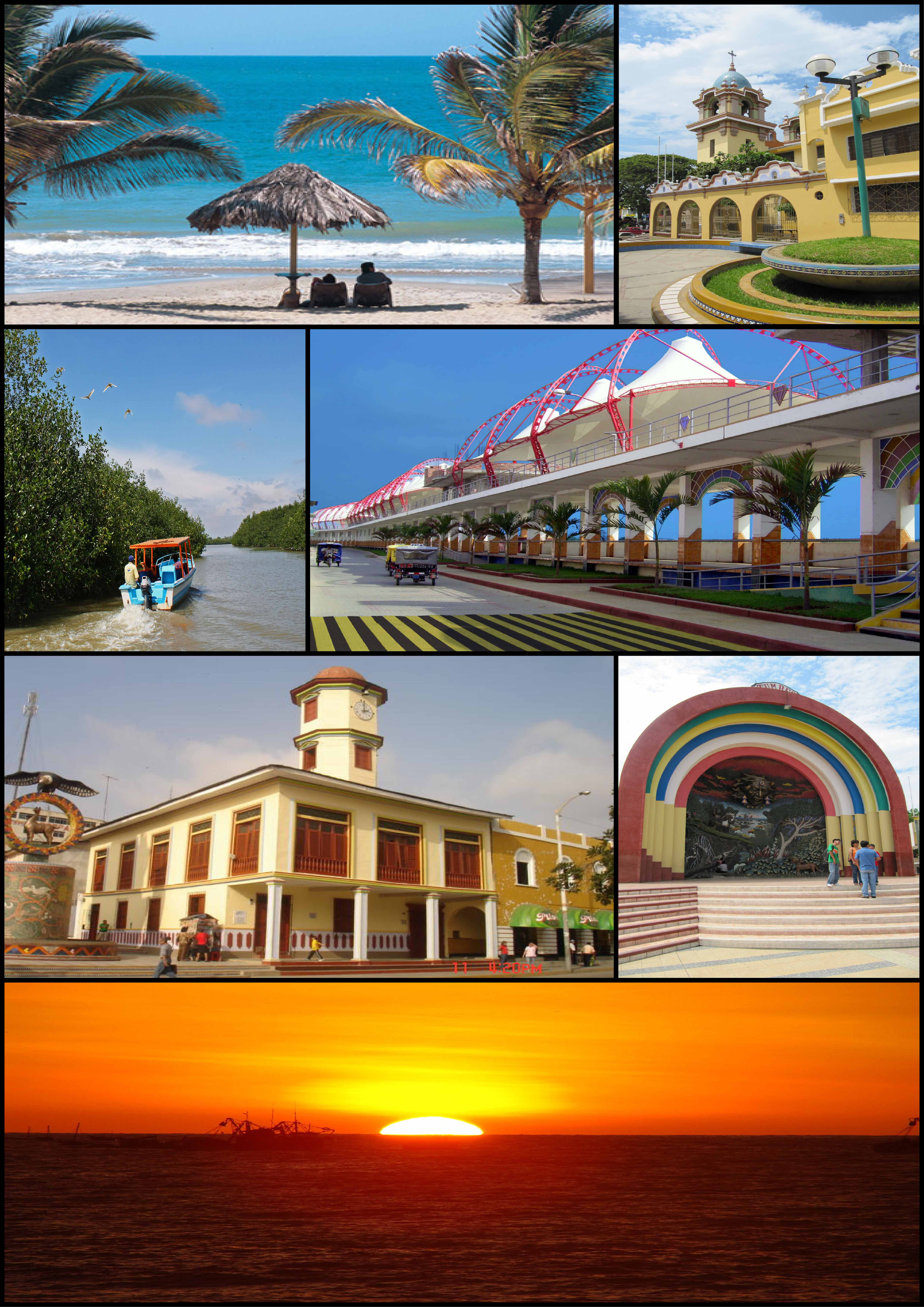
- Top left: Punta Sal Beach (Playa Punta Sal), Top right: Tumbes Cathedral, 2nd left: Tumbes River and Tumbes National Reserve Mangrove Sanctuary, 2nd right: Malecon Benavides, 3rd left: A Condor monument and Tumbes Clock Tower in Jerusalem Walks (Paseo Jerusalem), 3rd right: Armas Square (Plaza del Armas), Bottom: Sunset in Pizarro Port

- Flag Coat of arms

- Location within Peru
- Coordinates: 03°34′15″S 80°27′35″W
- Country: Peru
- Region: Tumbes
- Province: Tumbes
- District: Tumbes
- Demonym: Tumbesino(a)

Government
  - Mayor: Jimmy Silva

Area
  - Total: 1,800.15 km^{2} (695.04 sq mi)
- Elevation: 6 m (20 ft)

Population (2017)
  - Total: 96,946
  - Estimate (2015): 111,595
  - Density: 53.854/km^{2} (139.48/sq mi)

Tumbes is a city in northwestern Peru, on the banks of the Tumbes River. It is the capital of the Tumbes Region, as well as of Tumbes Province and Tumbes District. Located near the border with Ecuador, Tumbes has 111,595 inhabitants as of 2015. It is served by the Cap. FAP Pedro Canga Rodriguez Airport. It is located on the Gulf of Guayaquil along with Zorritos.

== History ==
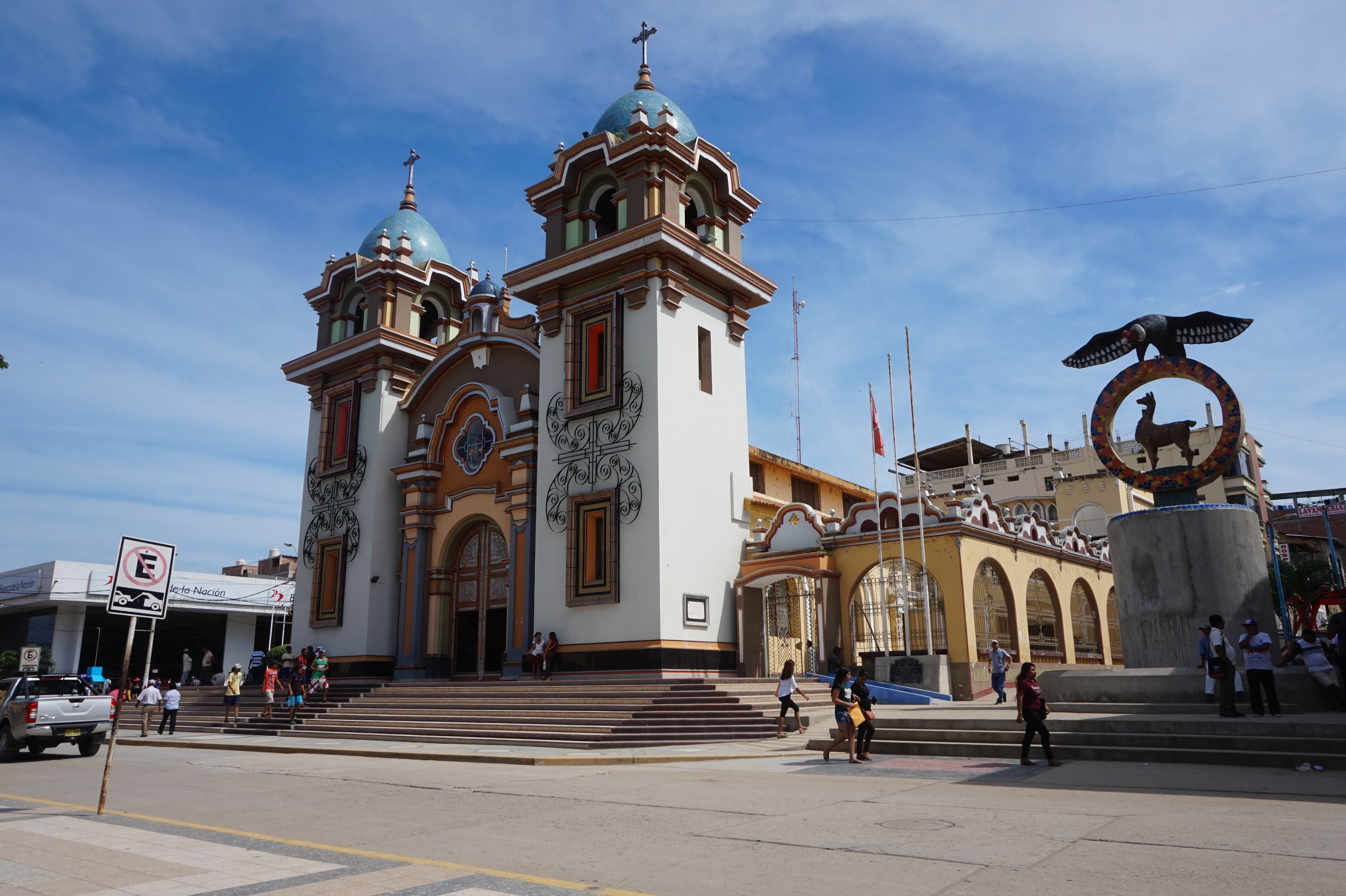
Tumbes Cathedral

Tumbes has its origins back in pre-Inca times when it was inhabited by a cultural group of natives called Tumpis. At its peak, its population is estimated to have reached 178,000. After 1400, Inca Pachacuti ruled over Tumbes and the territory became an important political stronghold during the Inca Empire. Later Inca emperor Huayna Capac expanded Tumbes by ordering the construction of roads, houses and palaces.

=== Spanish arrival ===
Tumbes was first visited by Spanish conquistador Francisco Pizarro during the start of the Spanish conquest of the Inca Empire in 1528. Molina noted that Tumbes was a well organized town. Pizarro made a second expedition in 1532 during which he encountered resistance from the curaca (chieftain) Chilimaza in what became known as the Battle of the Manglares. Pizarro was eventually successful and is said to have planted a cross in the invaded territory as a sign of Hispanic victory. Felipillo and Yacané, the first South American Indigenous interpreters who later aided Pizarro and his followers during the conquest of Peru, were born in Tumbes.

=== Colony and independence ===
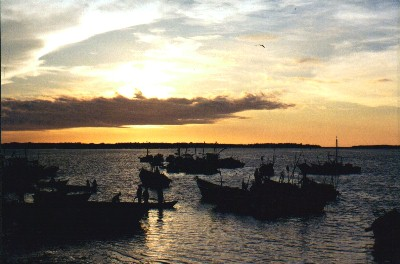
Port Pizarro

During its colonial period, Tumbes was sparsely populated and formed a part of the Audiencia of Quito through an unmodified Cedula of 1563 and Cedula of 1740. When Tumbes declared its independence from Spain, it opted to join Peru believing in the right of free determination of peoples. First, the Republic of the Gran Colombia challenged that right and then Ecuador claiming de jure rights through unmodified colonial Royal Decrees ( Real Cédulas ), but to no avail. The Protocol of Rio de Janeiro signed in 1942 with Ecuador legally confirmed Peru's previously de facto rights over Tumbes after a victorious war. However, lasting peace between both countries was not achieved until 1998, after a final conflict in 1995. Peruvian President Alberto Fujimori and Ecuadorian Presidente Jamil Mahuad signed a final document in which Ecuador accepted Perú's right over Tumbes and other territories claimed by Ecuador until then.

== Geography ==
=== Climate ===
Tumbes has a hot semi-arid climate (Köppen climate classification: BSh), although it receives an average annual rainfall of 307.5 millimetres or 12.1 inches, due to its high potential evapotranspiration. Rainfall is very variable due to the El Niño Southern Oscillation, with strong El Niños frequently seeing more than twice the mean rain.

Climate data for Tumbes, Peru (Cap. FAP Pedro Canga Rodríguez Airport) extremes 1974-present
Month	Jan	Feb	Mar	Apr	May	Jun	Jul	Aug	Sep	Oct	Nov	Dec	Year
Record high °C (°F)	37.0 (98.6)	36.8 (98.2)	39.6 (103.3)	36.6 (97.9)	35.6 (96.1)	40.0 (104.0)	39.1 (102.4)	38.0 (100.4)	33.8 (92.8)	33.5 (92.3)	34.1 (93.4)	35.3 (95.5)	40.0 (104.0)
Mean daily maximum °C (°F)	30.7 (87.3)	31.1 (88.0)	31.3 (88.3)	31.3 (88.3)	30.2 (86.4)	28.6 (83.5)	27.4 (81.3)	26.7 (80.1)	26.9 (80.4)	27.4 (81.3)	28.3 (82.9)	29.7 (85.5)	29.1 (84.4)
Daily mean °C (°F)	26.4 (79.5)	27.0 (80.6)	27.1 (80.8)	26.9 (80.4)	26.2 (79.2)	24.8 (76.6)	23.8 (74.8)	22.9 (73.2)	23.6 (74.5)	23.9 (75.0)	24.4 (75.9)	25.7 (78.3)	25.2 (77.4)
Mean daily minimum °C (°F)	22.1 (71.8)	22.3 (72.1)	22.6 (72.7)	22.4 (72.3)	21.7 (71.1)	20.7 (69.3)	19.4 (66.9)	19.0 (66.2)	19.3 (66.7)	19.9 (67.8)	20.4 (68.7)	21.4 (70.5)	20.9 (69.6)
Record low °C (°F)	15.6 (60.1)	16.4 (61.5)	15.0 (59.0)	14.2 (57.6)	14.0 (57.2)	14.4 (57.9)	15.0 (59.0)	12.0 (53.6)	12.0 (53.6)	12.6 (54.7)	14.0 (57.2)	12.0 (53.6)	12.0 (53.6)
Average rainfall mm (inches)	21.1 (0.83)	84.2 (3.31)	54.7 (2.15)	63.7 (2.51)	52.5 (2.07)	0.6 (0.02)	6.6 (0.26)	0.6 (0.02)	0.3 (0.01)	1.0 (0.04)	1.1 (0.04)	21.1 (0.83)	307.5 (12.09)
Average rainy days (≥ 1.0 mm)	4.0	7.4	6.1	4.6	2.3	0.2	0.3	0.2	0.3	0.3	0.5	2.2	28.4
Average relative humidity (%)	74	76	75	76	76	78	79	80	79	78	76	74	77
Source 1: Deutscher Wetterdienst
Source 2: Meteo Climat (record highs and lows)
