= Department of Tumbes =

Department of Peru

Tumbes
- Department
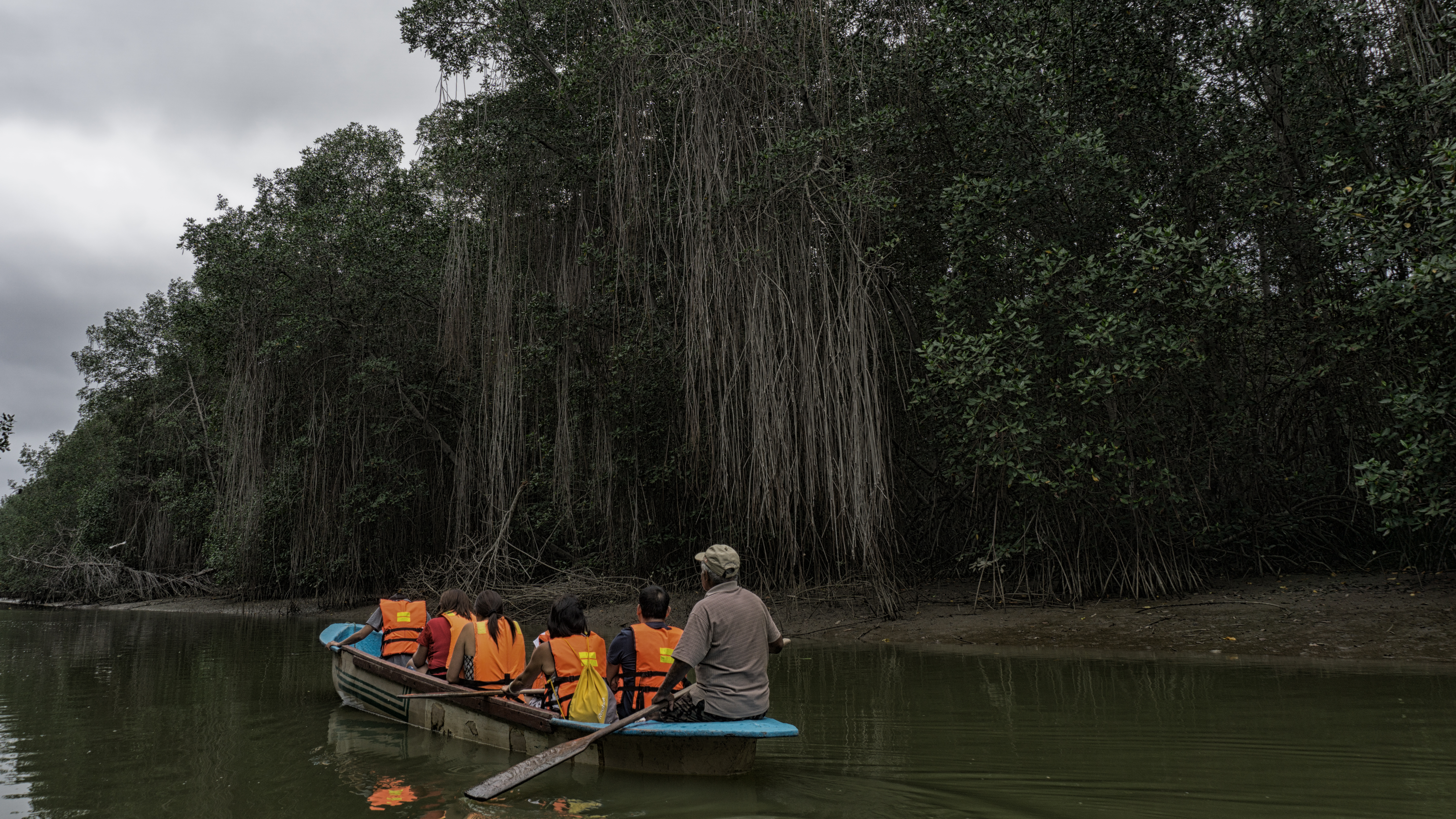
- Manglares de Tumbes National Sanctuary

- Flag Coat of arms

- Location of Tumbes within Peru
- Coordinates: 3.88°S 80.59°W
- Country: Peru
- Capital: Tumbes
- Provinces: List: Contralmirante Villar; Tumbes; Zarumilla

Government
  - Type: Regional Government
  - Governor: Avelina del Rosario Palacios de De Lama (2023-2026)

Area
  - Total: 4,045.86 km^{2} (1,562.12 sq mi)
- Elevation (Capital): 7 m (23 ft)
- Highest elevation: 134 m (440 ft)
- Lowest elevation: 0 m (0 ft)

Population (2025)
  - Total: 256,683
  - Density: 63.4434/km^{2} (164.318/sq mi)
- Demonym: tumbesino/a
- UBIGEO: 24
- Dialing code: 072
- ISO 3166 code: PE-TUM
- Principal resources: Petroleum, tobacco, bananas and fishing.
- Poverty rate: 46.8%
- Percentage of Peru's GDP: 0.49%
- Website: www.regiontumbes.gob.pe

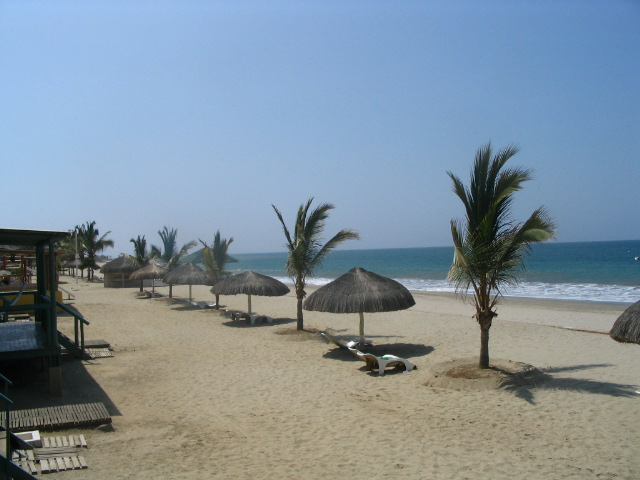
Punta Sal

Tumbes (Spanish pronunciation: [ˈtumbes]) is a department of Peru. It is located in the country's northwestern coast, bordering Ecuador. Due to its location near the Equator, it has a warm climate, with beaches that are considered among the finest in Peru. Despite its small area, the region contains a wide variety of ecosystems. It is the smallest department in Peru and its third least populous department after Moquegua and Madre de Dios, but it is also its third most densely populated department, after La Libertad and Lambayeque. It is administered by a regional government. Its capital is the city of Tumbes.

== Etymology ==
The department's name originates from either Tumpis, a group of native peoples from the area, the word tumbos, a species of Passiflora that used to abound in the area, or the name of the Tumba cacique, whose son founded and populated the area.

== History ==
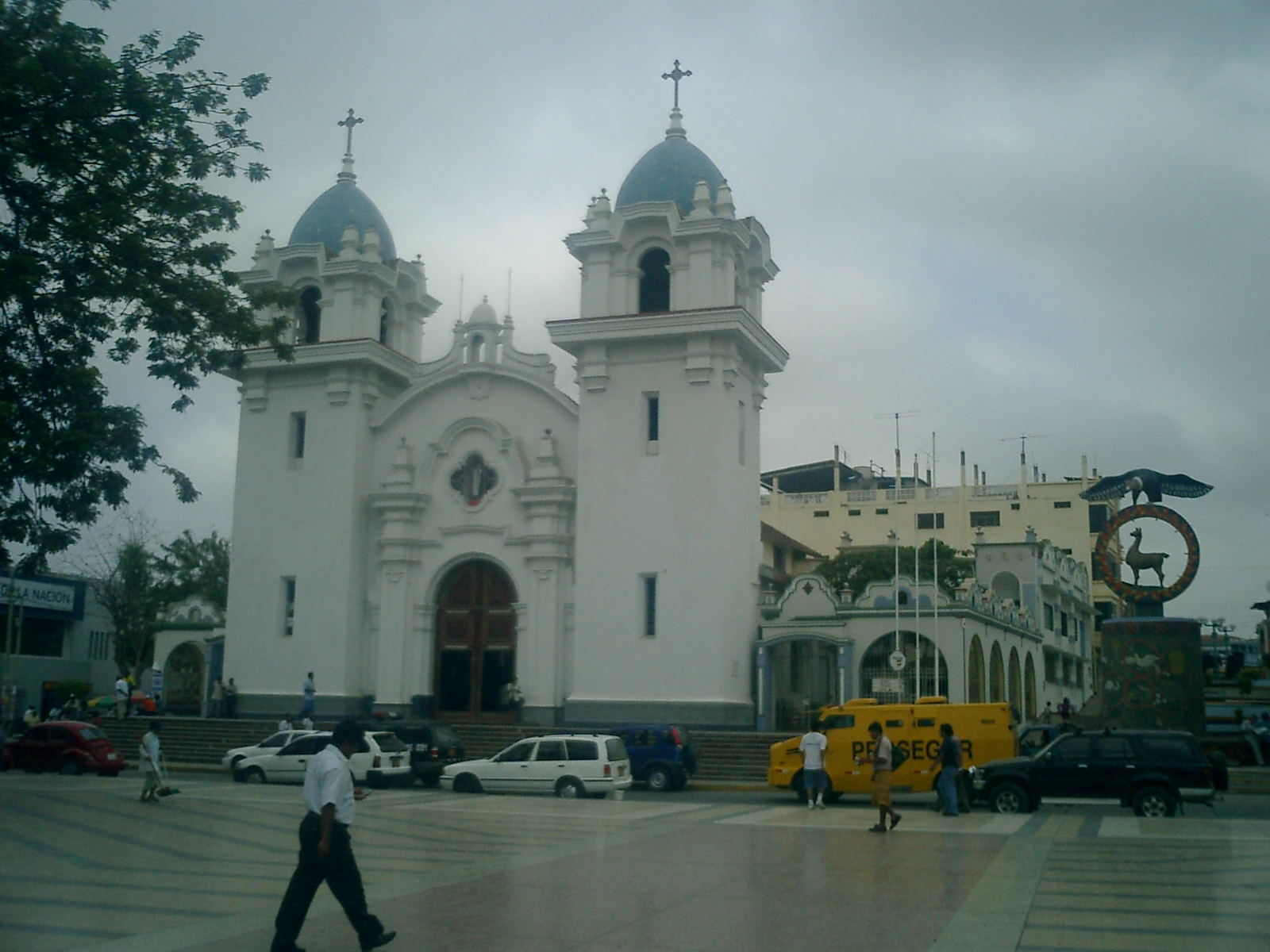
Tumbes cathedral.

Tumbes was a populated region well before the Inca Empire. The first settlers were fishers and hunters. Most recent cultures that lived there have left evidence of the refinement in their ceramics, and huacas or ruins that still stand today.

Tumbes was integrated into the Inca Empire during the reign of Sapa Inca Pachacuti. He introduced a new way of organizing the empire, but the task of integration continued during Tupac Inca Yupanqui's and Huayna Capac's reigns. He made it a key departure point for his campaign to conquer the Cañaris.

The adventure of the Spanish Conquistadores had its beginning in Tumbes: at Puerto Pizarro Francisco Pizarro and his men landed in search of gold. The conquerors set off to the rest of the empire, founding cities and overpowering their people.

On January 12, 1871, what was then the district of Tumbes was elevated to the Province of Tumbes. This province was renamed as the Littoral Province of Tumbes from 1901 onwards.

During colonial times, Tumbes was no more than a crossing point where soldiers and adventurers stopped momentarily to restock themselves, and continue traveling. Tumbes, however, gained permanent importance after Peru's independence; with Ecuador's long-standing territorial claims over the Loreto Region of Peru, Tumbes's closeness to the border exposed it as a resistance point in some episodes of the Ecuadorian–Peruvian War.

Following the events of the war, the province was upgraded into a department of Peru in 1942.

As part of the decentralization process in Peru, a referendum was held on October 30, 2005, to decide whether the region would merge with the regions of Piura and Lambayeque to create the new Northern Region (Spanish: Región Norte). However, voters in the region voted against the merger.

== Geography ==
The Tumbes Region is bordered by the Ecuadorian provinces of El Oro and Loja on the east; Peru's Piura Region on the south; and by the Pacific Ocean on the north and west.

Morphologically, four zones can be defined in the region: the delta of the Tumbes and Zarumilla rivers; an alluvial plain north of the Tumbes River, with dry, low-depth ravines; ancient terraces that have been strongly eroded in the Máncora area; and the Amotape mountain range in the east and south, ending at El Barco Mountain. The delta of the Tumbes river is shallow, and when the tide is low, little sandy keys show up, which get covered by mangrove vegetation. Despite its small area— it is the second-smallest region in Peru— Tumbes has a great variety of ecosystems: mangroves, Tumbes–Piura dry forests, the only coastal tropical forests in Peru, and a rich and warm sea. Around 50% of the region's territory is covered by three protected natural areas: the Manglares de Tumbes National Sanctuary (which is part of the Gulf of Guayaquil–Tumbes mangroves), the Cerros de Amotape National Park and the Tumbes Reserved Zone.

== Politics ==
=== Subdivisions ===
Map of provinces

The region is divided into three provinces (Spanish: provincias, singular: provincia), which are composed of twelve districts (distritos, singular: distrito).

The provinces, with their capitals in parentheses, are:

- Contralmirante Villar (Zorritos)
- Tumbes (Tumbes)
- Zarumilla (Zarumilla)

== Demographics ==
Basically composed of a large mestizo population rooted in a mixture between the pre-Incan Tumpis and Tallanes tribes, Spanish, creoles, the African peoples, including mulatos or zambos, and a small Chinese community of mostly Cantonese ancestry.

=== Population ===
According to the 1993 Census, the Tumbes Region has a population of 155,521 inhabitants, 53% of which (82,426) are male and 47% (73,095) are female.

As of 2005, the Instituto Nacional de Estadística e Informática estimates the region's population to be 215,634.

According to the adjusted 2025 census results, 256,683 people lived in the region.

=== Languages ===
The majority of the region's residents (98.3%) speak Spanish as their native tongue; other languages spoken are Quechua (0.4%), foreign languages (0.1%), Aymara (60 speakers, 0.0%), and other indigenous languages (0.1%).

=== Immigration ===
Immigrants from other regions make up 29.4% of the population; 0.2% of residents were born in a foreign country. The largest immigrant groups are from the regions of Piura (16.9% of the total population), Lambayeque (3.7%), and the Lima Province/Lima Region (2.8%).

=== Age ===
The population age distribution is 49.4% under the age of 20, 10.7% from 20 to 24, 26.6% from 25 to 44, 9.7% from 45 to 64, and 3.5% who are 65 years of age or older.

== Education ==
The literacy rate in the region is 90.4%.

Secondary education has been completed by 31.8% of the population and 4.5% also have graduated from non-university higher education, while 2.3% have complete university studies. 45.9% only have attended primary education and 5.9% have not had any education.

== Culture ==
=== Landmarks ===
The fact that Tumbes lies so close to the Equator has determined its landscape, which teems in plant life. The beaches of Tumbes and its warm sea are ideal for surfing and scuba diving. Its pure white sands, sun and warm weather all year long, and a sea ideal for water sports, make the beach of Punta Sal one of the finest on the Peruvian coast. North of the city of Tumbes lies Puerto Pizarro, the gateway to the National Mangroves Sanctuary. The mangroves have formed vast clumps of saltwater-tolerant coastal forests which have created a unique ecosystem linking the river and the sea. The mangroves are the breeding grounds for black scallops, which are served up in Tumbes' most famous dish, the black scallop ceviche.

South of Tumbes lies Zorritos, the town which received its name from workers involved in drilling the first oilwell in the area, back in 1863. Not far from Zorritos lies the Bocapán beach, where visitors can swim in Hervideros, natural hot springs bubbling with iodized salts.

=== Gastronomy ===
The typical dishes of the Tumbesino cuisine are based on seafood— ceviche of black scallops, crab, or shrimps, or cebiche mixto— and Tumbiresas covered by yucca and banana balls broth with dominicos, meat, red peppers, eggs, olives, raisins, flour, coriander and other herbs.

Other specialties include the shrimp omelette, chupe de cangrejos, and crabmeat omelette.

A typical beverage in the region is the chinguirito, which is obtained by combining pipa (the milk of a soft coconut) with the famous grape brandy called pisco.
