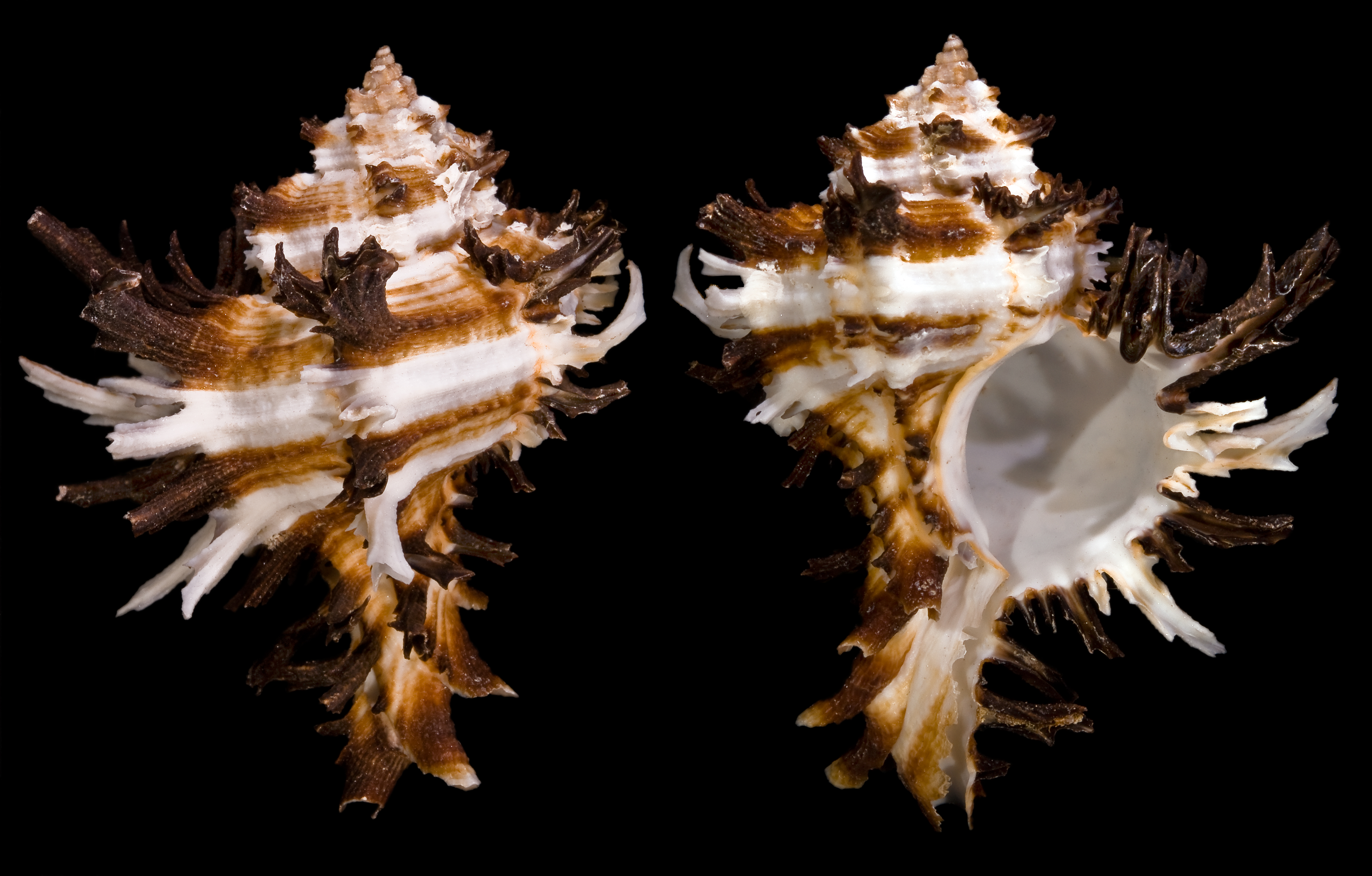
- Two views of a shell of Hexaplex cichoreum

Scientific classification
- Kingdom: Animalia
- Phylum: Mollusca
- Class: Gastropoda
- Subclass: Caenogastropoda
- Order: Neogastropoda
- Family: Muricidae
- Subfamily: Muricinae
- Genus: Hexaplex; Perry, 1811

Type species
- Hexaplex cichoreum (Gmelin, 1791)

Synonyms
- Aaronia A. H. Verrill, 1950; Bassia Jousseaume, 1880; Bassiella Wenz, 1941; Centronotus Swainson, 1833 (invalid: junior homonym of Centronotus ^{Schneider, 1801} [Pisces]); Hexaplex (Hexaplex) Perry, 1810; Hexaplex (Muricanthus) Swainson, 1840; Hexaplex (Trunculariopsis) Cossmann, 1921; Murex (Muricanthus) Swainson, 1840; Muricanthus Swainson, 1840; Murithais Grant & Gale, 1931 (invalid: junior objective synonym of Trunculariopsis Cossmann, 1921); Purpura Röding, 1798 (invalid: junior homonym of Purpura Bruguière, 1789); Truncularia Monterosato, 1917 (invalid: junior homonym of Truncularia Wiegmann, 1832 [Bryozoa]; Trunculariopsis is a replacement name)

= Hexaplex =

Hexaplex Temporal range: Early Paleocene - Recent 61.7 - 0 Ma

Genus of gastropods

Hexaplex is a genus of medium-sized to large sea snails, marine gastropod mollusks in the subfamily Muricinae of the family Muricidae, the murex shells or rock snails.

This genus is known in the fossil record from the Paleocene to the Quaternary period (age range: from 61.7 to 0.012 million years ago.). Fossil shells within this genus have been found all over the world.

== Description ==
This genus includes shells in the family Muricidae that are solid and globose. They contain five to eight varices that are more or less foliaceous.

== Species ==
Species within the genus Hexaplex include :

- Hexaplex angularis (Lamarck, 1822)
- †Hexaplex arietinus (Millet, 1865)
- Hexaplex bifasciatus (A. Adams, 1853)
- † Hexaplex bourgeoisi (Tournouër, 1875)
- Hexaplex brassica (Lamarck, 1822)
- Hexaplex cichoreum (Gmelin, 1791)
- Hexaplex conatus (McMichael, 1964)
- Hexaplex duplex Röding, 1798
- Hexaplex erythrostomus (Swainson, 1831)
- Hexaplex fulvescens (Sowerby II, 1834)
- Hexaplex kuesterianus (Tapparone-Canefri, 1875)
- † Hexaplex ledoni Ceulemans, van Dingenen, Merle & Landau, 2016
- Hexaplex megacerus (G.B. Sowerby II, 1834)
- Hexaplex pecchiolianus (d'Ancona, 1871)
- Hexaplex princeps (Broderip, 1833)
- Hexaplex regius (Swainson, 1821)
- Hexaplex rileyi D'Attilio & Myers, 1984
- Hexaplex rosarium (Röding, 1798)
- Hexaplex saharicus (Locard, 1897)
- Hexaplex stainforthi (Reeve, 1843)
- † Hexaplex tapparonii (Bellardi, 1873)
- † Hexaplex tridentatus (Tate, 1888)
- Hexaplex trunculus (Linnaeus, 1758)
- † Hexaplex turonensis (Dujardin, 1837)

Species brought into synonymy

- Hexaplex ambiguus (Reeve, 1845): synonym of Muricanthus ambiguus (Reeve, 1845)
- Hexaplex anatomica Perry, 1811: synonym of Homalocantha anatomica (Perry, 1811) (original combination)
- Hexaplex bojadorensis (Locard, 1897): synonym of Favartia bojadorensis (Locard, 1897)
- Hexaplex bozzadamii (Franchi, 1990): synonym of Hexaplex kusterianus bozzadamii (Franchi, 1990),: synonym of Hexaplex kuesterianus bozzadamii (Franchi, 1990)
- Hexaplex foliacea Perry, 1811: synonym of Hexaplex cichoreum (Gmelin, 1791) (synonym)
- Hexaplex fusca Perry, 1811: synonym of Homalocantha scorpio (Linnaeus, 1758) (synonym)
- Hexaplex kusterianus: synonym of Hexaplex kuesterianus (Tapparone Canefri, 1875) (misspelling)
- Hexaplex nigritus (Philippi, 1845): synonym of Muricanthus nigritus (Philippi, 1845)
- Hexaplex punctuata Perry, 1811: synonym of Hexaplex fulvescens (G. B. Sowerby II, 1834) (nomen oblitum)
- Hexaplex puniceus W. R. B. Oliver, 1915: synonym of Favartia garrettii (Pease, 1868)
- Hexaplex radix (Gmelin, 1791): synonym of Muricanthus radix (Gmelin, 1791)
- Hexaplex ryalli Houart, 1993: synonym of Hexaplex saharicus ryalli Houart, 1993 (original combination)
- Hexaplex strausi (A.H. Verrill, 1950): synonym of Muricanthus strausi (A. H. Verrill, 1950)
- Hexaplex tenuis Perry, 1811: synonym of Homalocantha scorpio (Linnaeus, 1758) (synonym)
- Hexaplex turbinatus : synonym of Hexaplex duplex (Röding, 1798)
- Hexaplex varius (Sowerby II, 1834): synonym of Chicoreus varius (G. B. Sowerby II, 1834)

== Extinct species ==
Extinct species within the genus Hexaplex include:

- †Hexaplex (Hexaplex) colei Palmer 1937
- †Hexaplex (Hexaplex) engonatus Conrad 1833
- †Hexaplex (Hexaplex) etheringtoni Vokes 1968
- †Hexaplex (Hexaplex) katherinae Vokes 1968
- †Hexaplex (Hexaplex) marksi Harris 1894
- †Hexaplex (Hexaplex) silvaticus Palmer 1937
- †Hexaplex (Hexaplex) supernus Palmer 1947
- †Hexaplex (Hexaplex) texanus Vokes 1968
- †Hexaplex (Hexaplex) vanuxemi Conrad 1865
- †Hexaplex (Hexaplex) veatchi Maury 1910
- †Hexaplex (Trunculariopsis) bourgeoisi Tournouër 1875
- †Hexaplex (Trunculariopsis) brevicanthos Sismonda 1847
- †Hexaplex (Trunculariopsis) campanii De Stefani and Pantanelli 1878
- †Hexaplex (Trunculariopsis) rudis Borson 1821
- †Hexaplex hertweckorum Petuch 1988

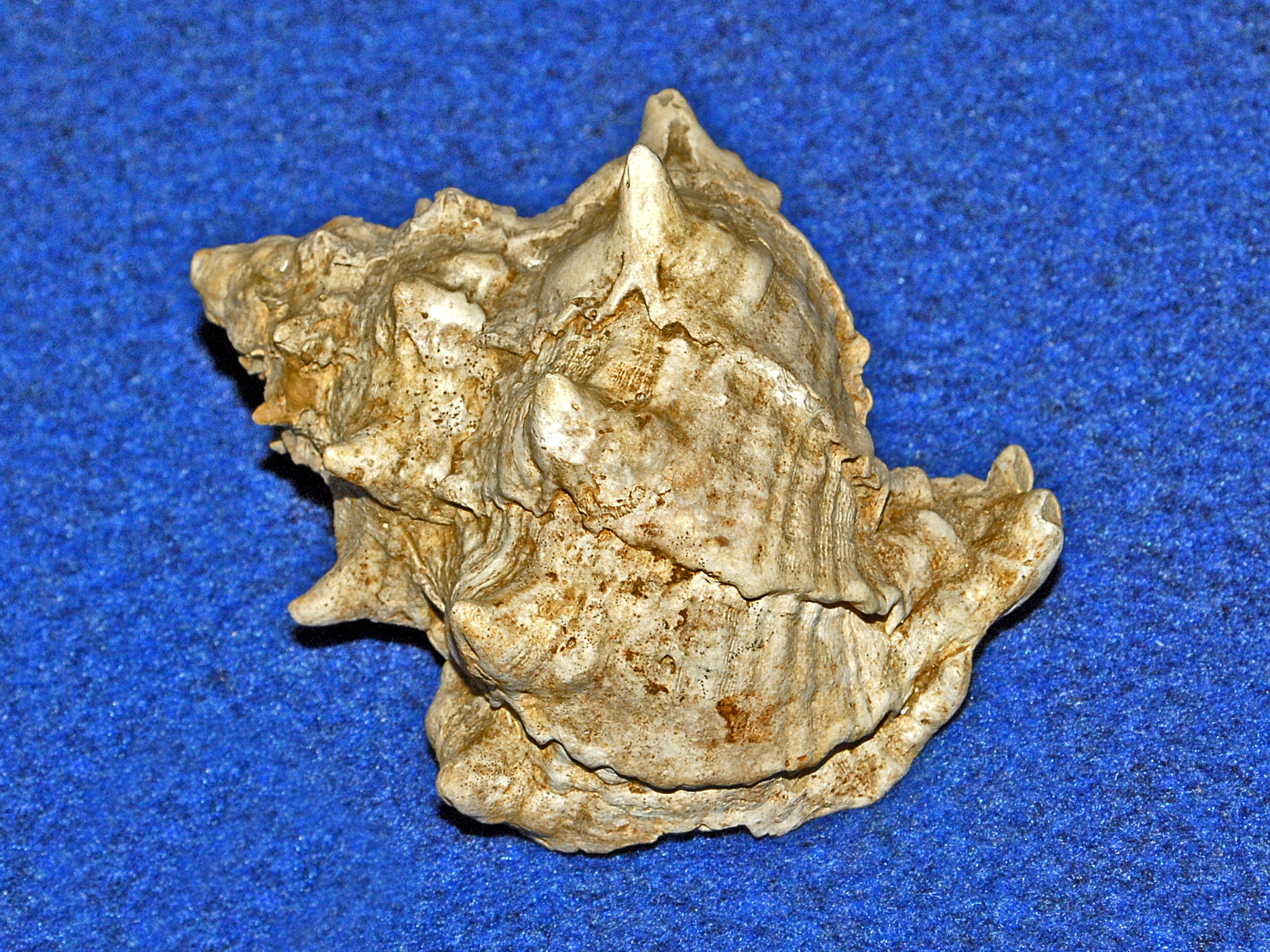
Fossil shell of Hexaplex trunculus
