= Rosarium (disambiguation) =

A rosarium is a rose garden. It may also refer to:

== Religion ==
- Rosary (Latin: rosarium, in the sense of "crown/garland of roses"), an aspect of Catholic devotion
- Rosarium Virginis Mariae, an Apostolic Letter by Pope John Paul II, declaring October 2002 to October 2003 the "Year of the Rosary"
- Rosary of the Philosophers (Rosarium philosophorum sive pretiosissimum donum Dei), a 16th-century alchemical treatise

== Specific rose gardens ==
- Europa-Rosarium, formerly the Rosarium Sangerhausen, in Sangerhausen, Saxony-Anhalt, Germany
- Rosarium Uetersen in the Rosenstadt Uetersen, Schleswig-Holstein, Germany

== Biology ==
- Ctenotus rosarium, a species of skink found in Queensland, Australia
- Hexaplex rosarium, a species of sea snail

== See also ==
- Rose Garden (disambiguation)
- Rosaria (disambiguation)
- Rosario (disambiguation)
- Rosarius (disambiguation)
