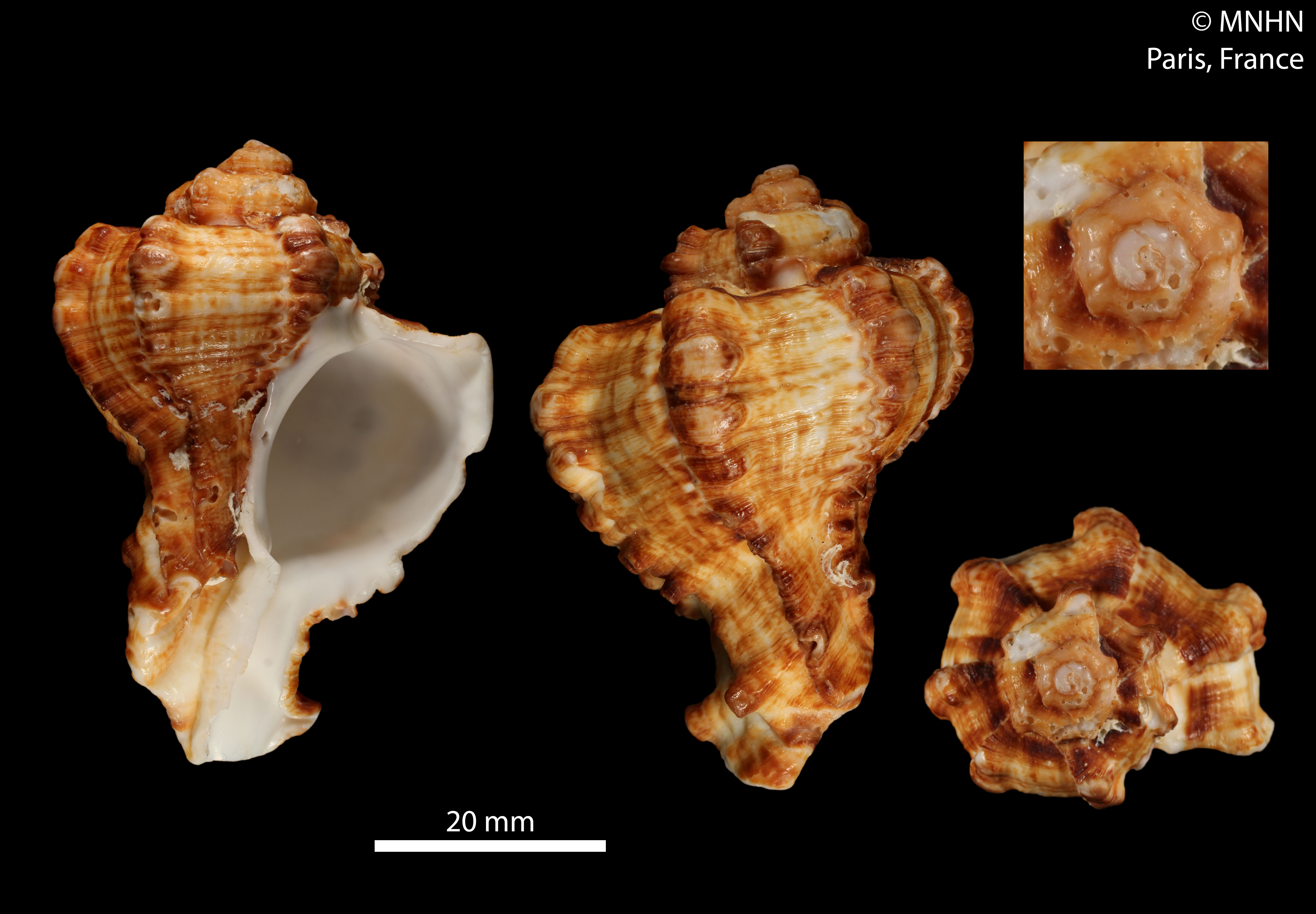
- Shell of Hexaplex kuesterianus bozzadamii (paratype at MNHN, Paris)

Scientific classification
- Kingdom: Animalia
- Phylum: Mollusca
- Class: Gastropoda
- Subclass: Caenogastropoda
- Order: Neogastropoda
- Family: Muricidae
- Genus: Hexaplex
- Species: H. kuesterianus
- Subspecies: H. k. bozzadamii

Trinomial name
- Hexaplex kuesterianus bozzadamii (Franchi, 1990)

Synonyms
- Hexaplex (Hexaplex) kuesterianus bozzadamii (Franchi, 1990)· accepted, alternate representation; Hexaplex (Hexaplex) kusterianus bozzadamii (Franchi, 1990)· accepted, alternate representation; Hexaplex bozzadamii (Franchi, 1990); Hexaplex kusterianus bozzadamii (misspelling of species names); Muricanthus bozzadamii Franchi, 1990

= Hexaplex kuesterianus bozzadamii =

Species of gastropod

Hexaplex kuesterianus bozzadamii is a subspecies of sea snail, a marine gastropod mollusc in the family Muricidae, the murex snails or rock snails.

== Distribution ==
This marine species occurs off Somalia.
