= H. foliata =

H. foliata may refer to:

- Hexaplex foliata, a synonym for Hexaplex cichoreum, a sea snail species
- Hoplocorypha foliata, a praying mantis species found in Tanzania

== See also ==
- Foliata (disambiguation)
