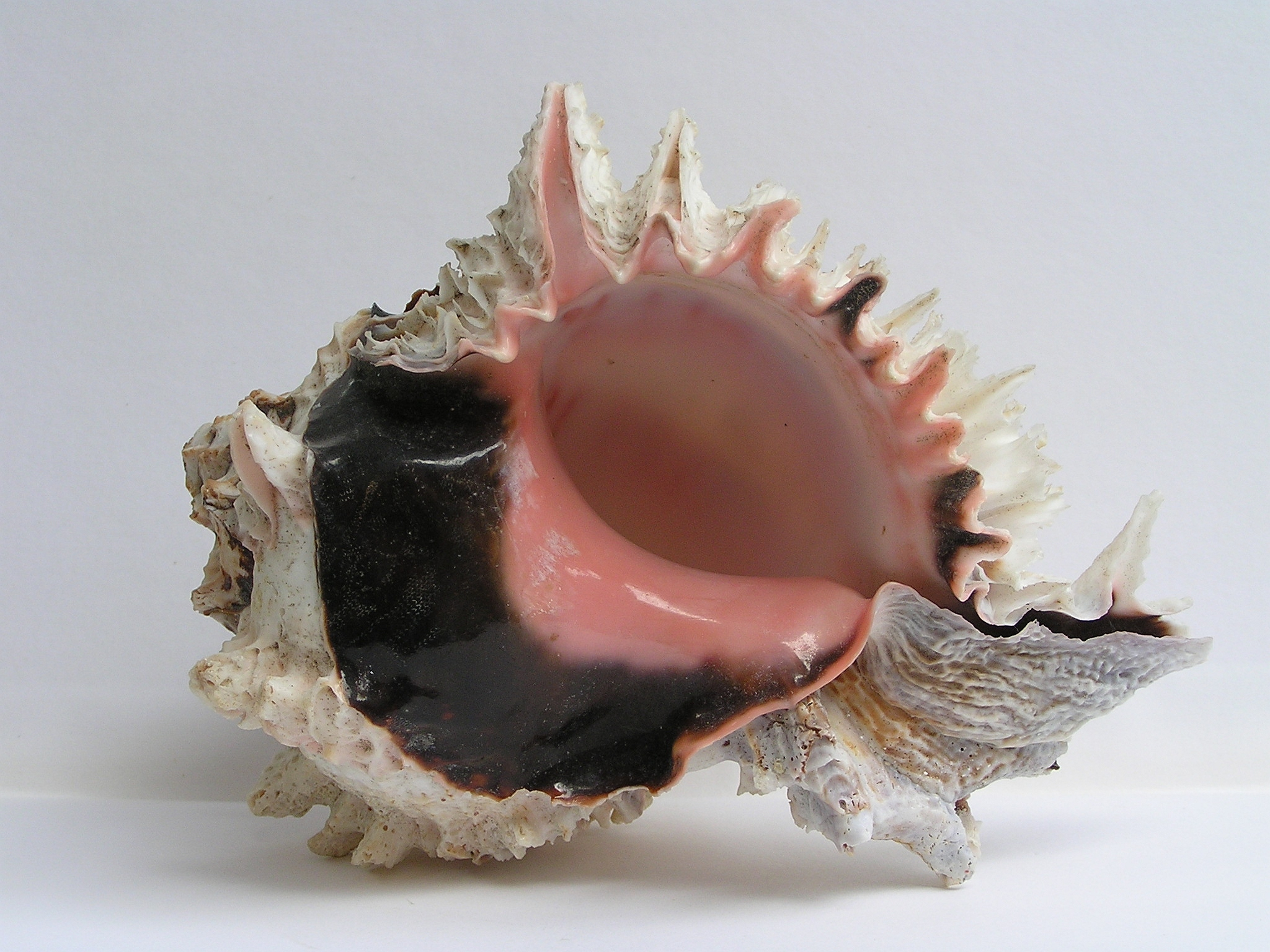
- Apertural view of Hexaplex regius

Scientific classification
- Kingdom: Animalia
- Phylum: Mollusca
- Class: Gastropoda
- Subclass: Caenogastropoda
- Order: Neogastropoda
- Family: Muricidae
- Genus: Hexaplex
- Species: H. regius

Binomial name
- Hexaplex regius (Swainson, 1821)

Synonyms
- Chicoreus (Phyllonotus) regius (Swainson, 1821); Hexaplex (Muricanthus) regius Swainson, W.A., 1821; Murex regius Swainson, 1821; Murex tricolor Valenciennes, 1832; Phyllonotus regius (Swainson, 1821)

= Hexaplex regius =

Species of gastropod

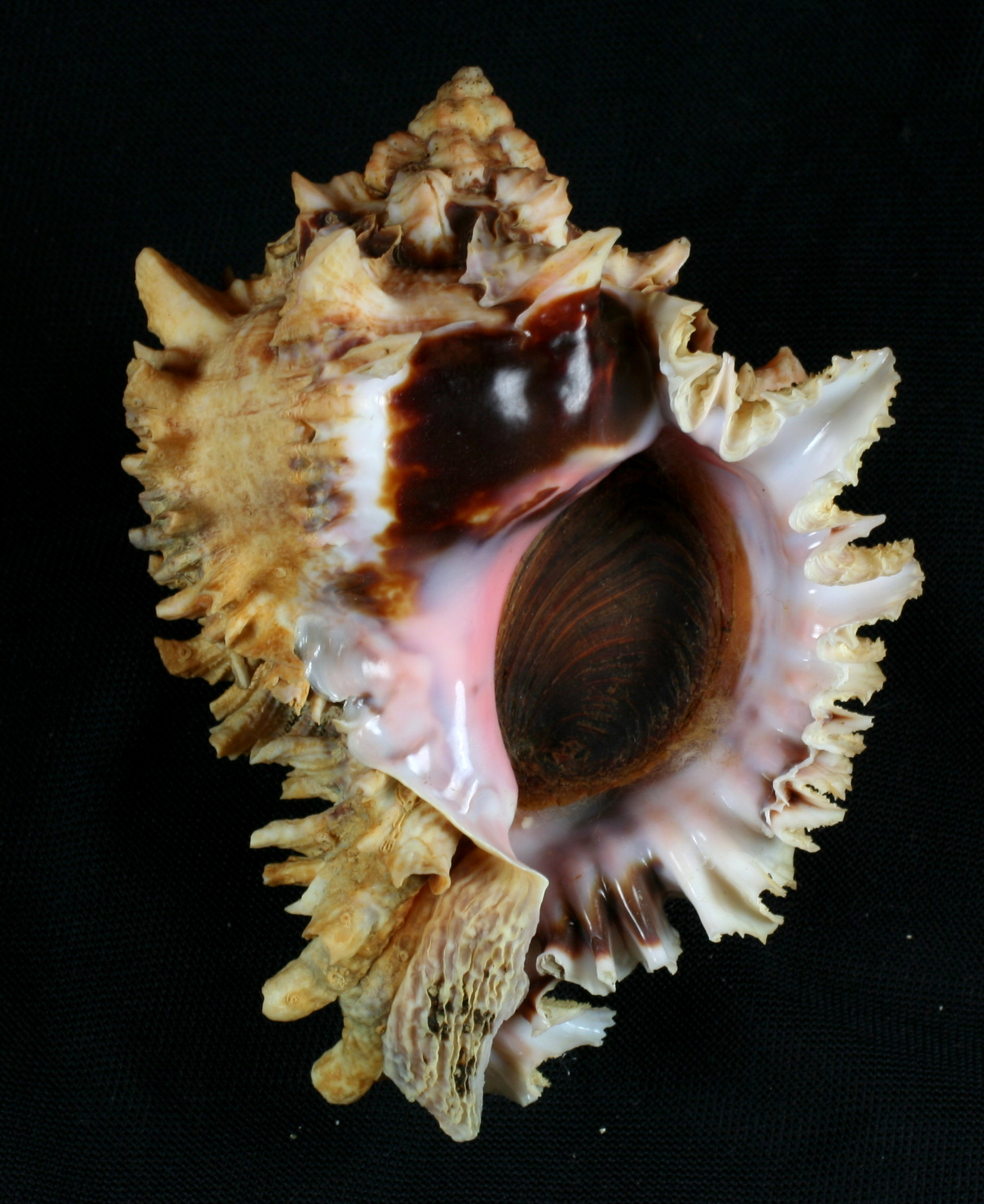
Shell of Hexaplex regius (Swainson, 1821) with operculum, measuring 94.2 mm in height, found at low tide at Fort Kobbe, in Panama.

Hexaplex regius, common name: the regal murex, is a species of sea snail, a marine gastropod mollusk in the family Muricidae, the murex snails or rock snails.

== Description ==
The size of the adult shell varies between 60 mm and 180 mm. External colors are white with occasional brownish spiral stripes, which on some specimens may be absent. The colors of the aperture, or opening of the shell is pink at the edges and the glossy shield over the columella. At the top and some of the left side of the shield, the pink merges into a dark chocolate-brown staining, ending at the posterior canal. Further inside, the shell fades into a porcelain-white with faint, pink tinting. The siphonal canal is a mixture of pink and light brown.

The sculpture overall is both described as prickly and frond-like; the spines are numerous and scaly. In between spine rows, the shell is lirate.

== Distribution ==
This species occurs in the Pacific Ocean between Baja California and Peru (but not along the Galapagos Islands).
