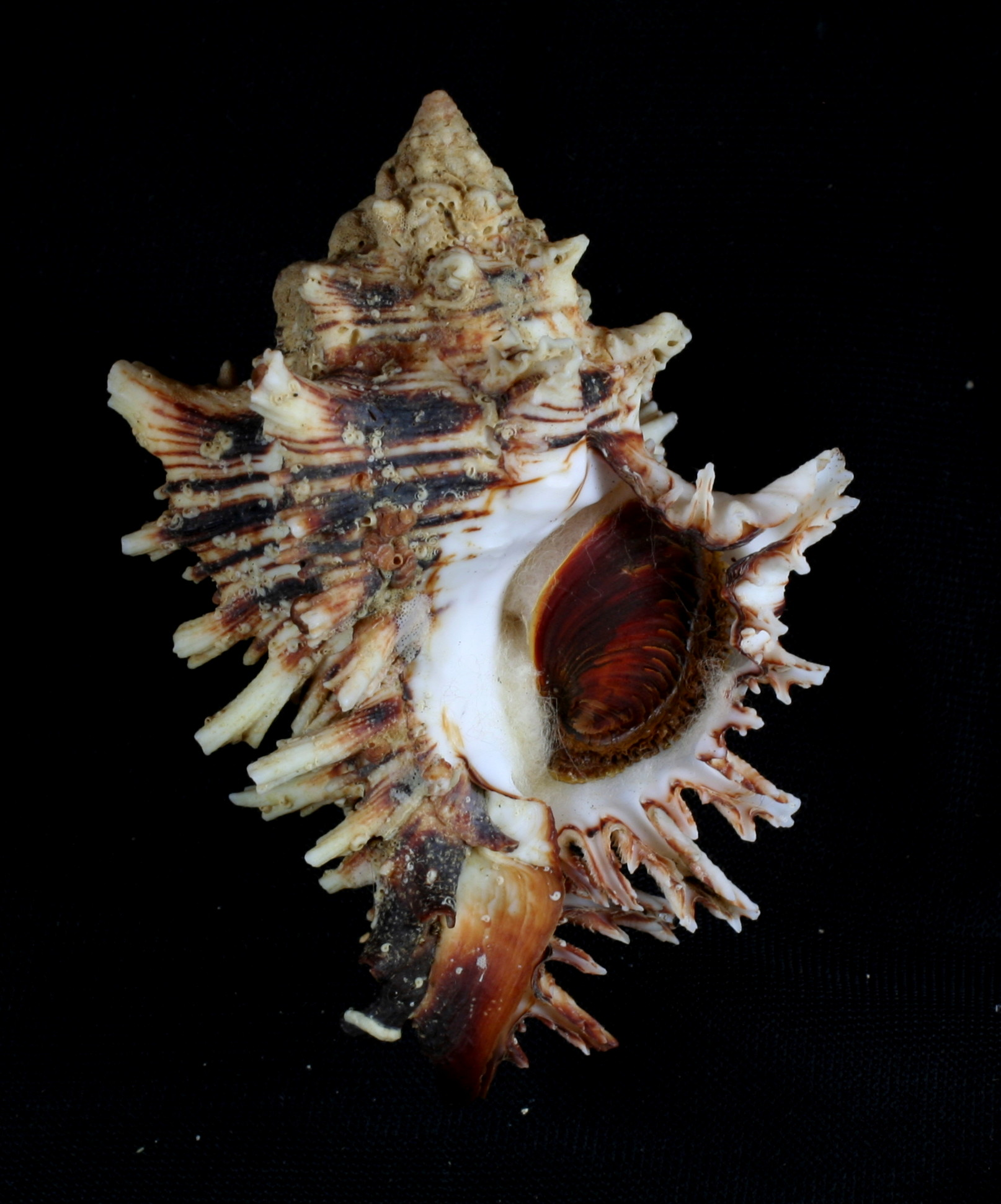
- Shell of Hexaplex princeps (Broderip, 1833), and operculum, measuring 106.8 mm in height, collected at low tide on Perlas Island, in Panama.

Scientific classification
- Kingdom: Animalia
- Phylum: Mollusca
- Class: Gastropoda
- Subclass: Caenogastropoda
- Order: Neogastropoda
- Family: Muricidae
- Genus: Hexaplex
- Subgenus: Trunculariopsis
- Species: H. princeps

Binomial name
- Hexaplex princeps (Broderip, 1833)

Synonyms
- Murex nitidus Broderip, 1833; Murex princeps Broderip, 1833

= Hexaplex princeps =

Species of gastropod

Hexaplex princeps is a species of sea snail, a marine gastropod mollusc in the family Muricidae, the murex snails or rock snails.
