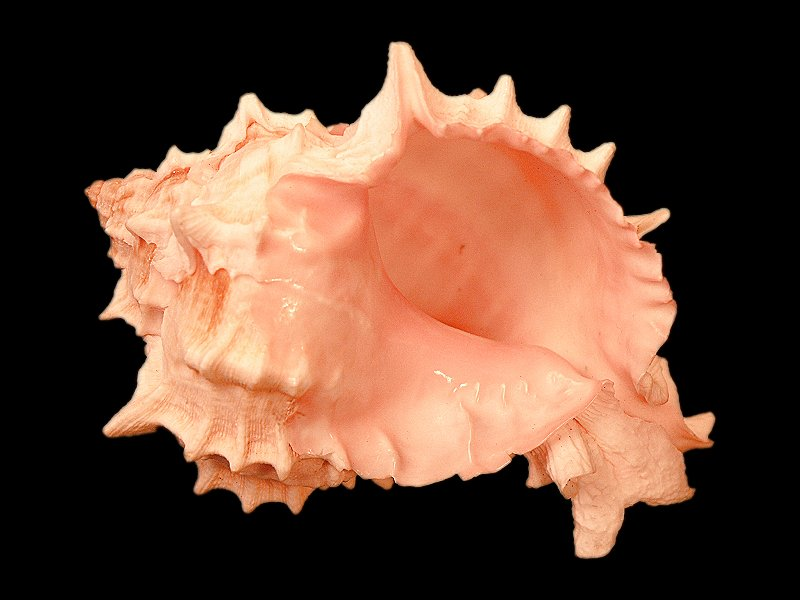
- apertural view of the shell of Hexaplex erythrostomus

Scientific classification
- Kingdom: Animalia
- Phylum: Mollusca
- Class: Gastropoda
- Subclass: Caenogastropoda
- Order: Neogastropoda
- Family: Muricidae
- Genus: Hexaplex
- Species: H. erythrostomus

Binomial name
- Hexaplex erythrostomus (Swainson, 1831)

Synonyms
- Chicoreus (Phyllonotus) erythrostomus (Swainson, 1831); Chicoreus erythrostomus (Swainson, 1831); Hexaplex (Muricanthus) erythrostomus (Swainson, 1831); Murex bicolor Valenciennes, 1832 (invalid: junior homonym of Murex bicolor Risso, 1826); Murex coccineus Lesson, 1844; Murex erythrostomus Swainson, 1831; Murex hippocastanum Philippi, 1845; Murex regius Schubert & Wagner, 1829 (invalid: junior homonym of Murex regius Swainson, 1821)

= Hexaplex erythrostomus =

Species of gastropod

Hexaplex erythrostomus is a species of sea snail, a marine gastropod mollusk in the family Muricidae, the murex snails or rock snails.

== Description ==
The shell of this species is globose and strong, ornamented with blunt spines. The aperture is circular. The siphonal canal is narrow, short and curved with decorations on the outside. The color of the outer part of the shell is white or shades of gray. The interior of the shell and the aperture is deep pink and glossy.

== Distribution ==
The species occurs on the west coast of Mexico from Baja California to Peru.

== Habitat ==
The species inhabits the intertidal and subtidal zones in sandy areas and sometimes on rocks

== Gallery ==
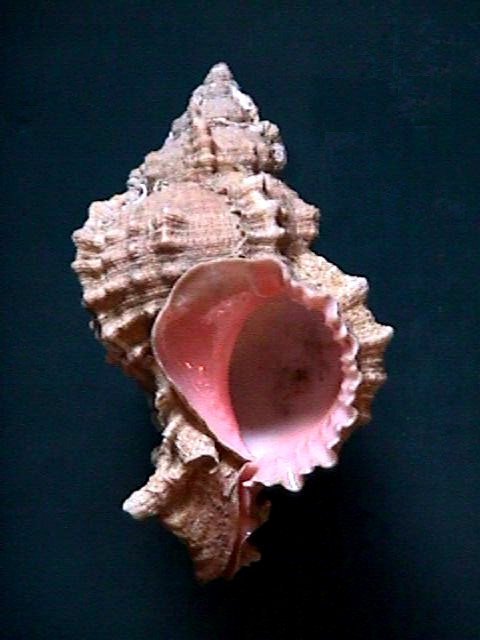
a shell of Hexaplex erythrostomus

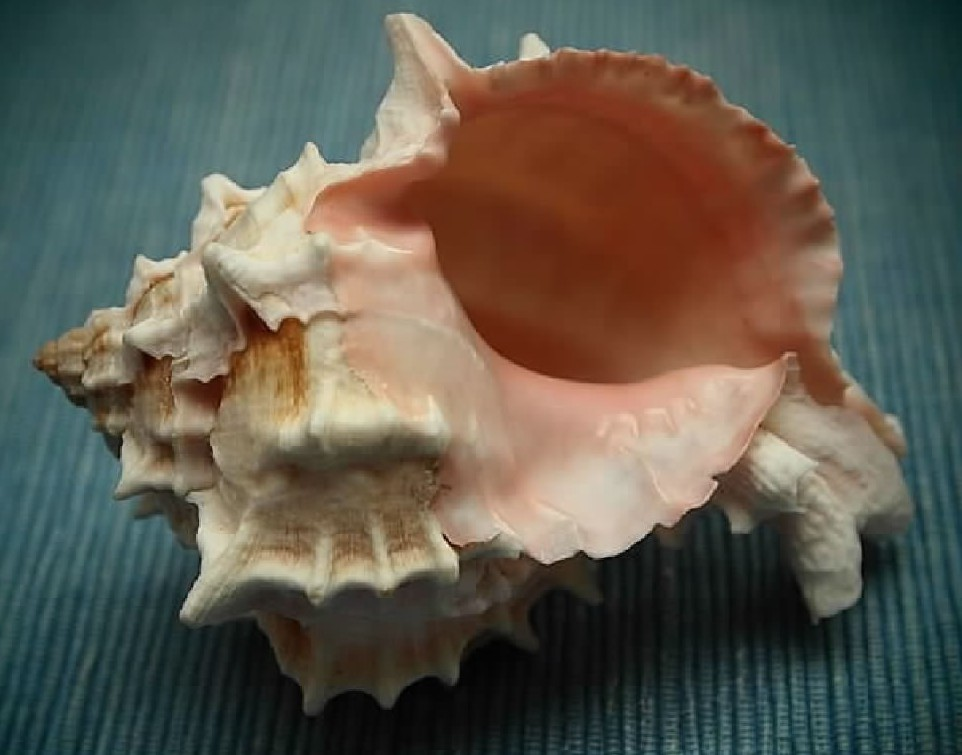
a shell of Hexaplex erythrostomus

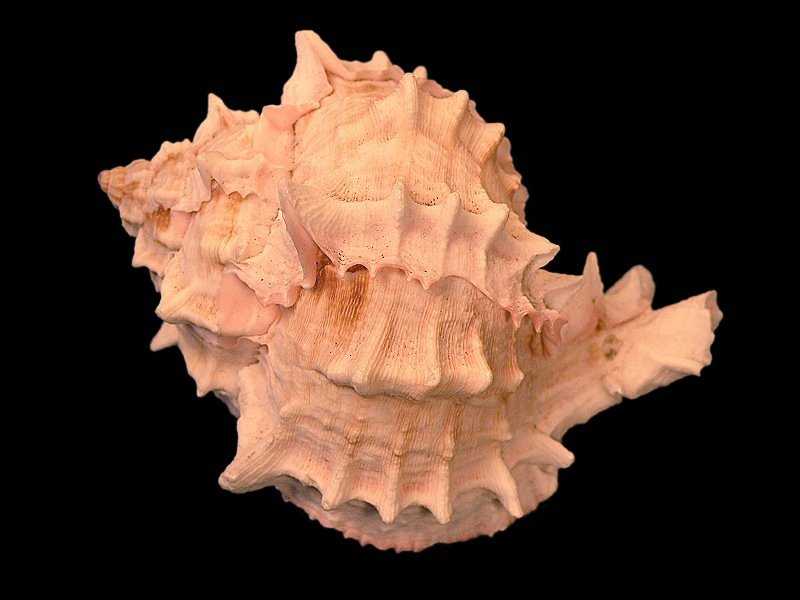
a shell of Hexaplex erythrostomus
