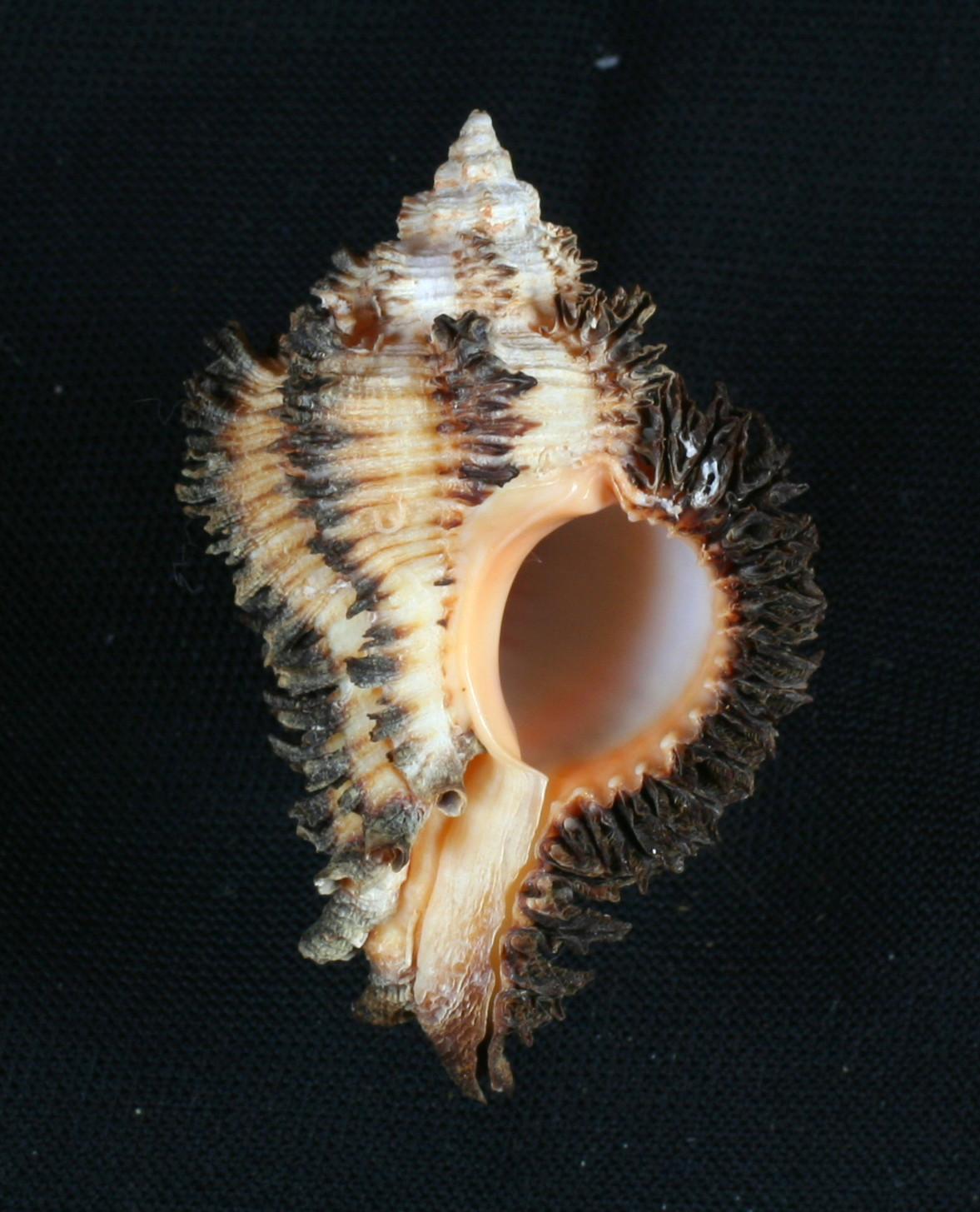
- Shell of Hexaplex stainforthi (Reeve, 1843), measuring 52.4 mm in height, from off Western Australia.

Scientific classification
- Kingdom: Animalia
- Phylum: Mollusca
- Class: Gastropoda
- Subclass: Caenogastropoda
- Order: Neogastropoda
- Family: Muricidae
- Genus: Hexaplex
- Species: H. stainforthi

Binomial name
- Hexaplex stainforthi (Reeve, 1843)

Synonyms
- Hexaplex (Hexaplex) stainforthi (Reeve, 1843) (alternate representation); Murex stainforthi Reeve, 1843

= Hexaplex stainforthi =

Species of gastropod

Hexaplex stainforthi is a species of sea snail, a marine gastropod mollusk in the family Muricidae, the murex snails or rock snails.
