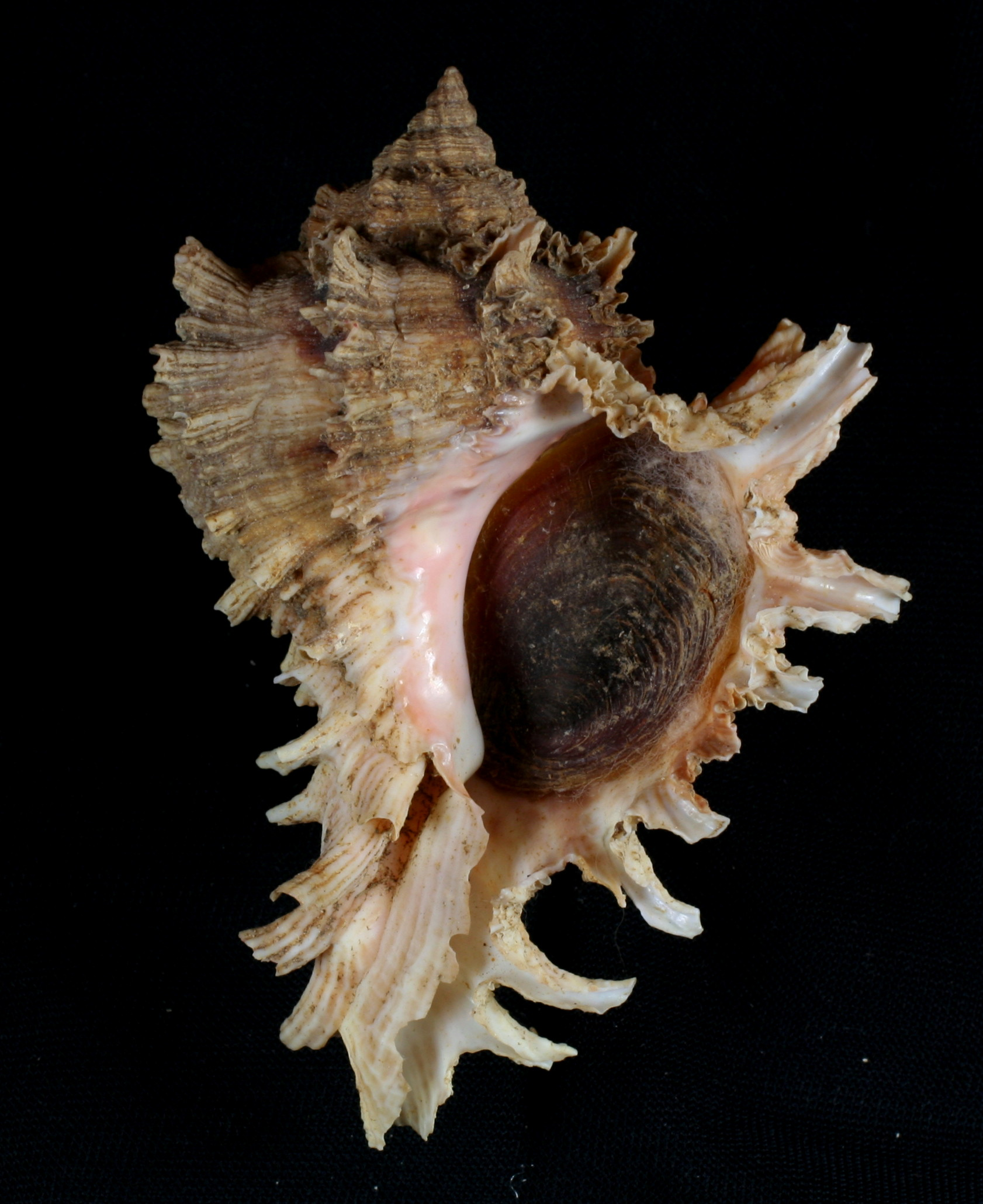
- Shell of Hexaplex duplex Röding, 1798, with operculum, measuring 93.5 mm in height, from off the mouth of the Joel River, in Senegal, Africa.

Scientific classification
- Kingdom: Animalia
- Phylum: Mollusca
- Class: Gastropoda
- Subclass: Caenogastropoda
- Order: Neogastropoda
- Family: Muricidae
- Genus: Hexaplex
- Species: H. duplex

Binomial name
- Hexaplex duplex Röding, 1798

Synonyms
- Hexaplex (Trunculariopsis) duplex (Röding, 1798) · accepted, alternate representation; Hexaplex (Trunculariopsis) duplex canariensis (Nordsieck, 1975); Hexaplex (Trunculariopsis) duplex duplex (Röding, 1798); Hexaplex turbinatus (Lamarck, 1822); Murex eurystomus Swainson, 1833; Murex hoplites P. Fischer, 1876; Murex minima Dautzenberg, 1910; Murex saxatilis Linnaeus (auctt.); Murex turbinatus Lamarck, 1822; Phyllonotus duplex (Röding, 1798); Purpura duplex Röding, 1798 (original combination); Trunculariopsis canariensis Nordsieck, 1975; Trunculariopsis trunculus canariensis F. Nordsieck, 1975

= Hexaplex duplex =

Species of gastropod

Hexaplex duplex is a species of sea snail, a marine gastropod mollusk in the family Muricidae, the murex snails or rock snails.

== Subspecies ==
Both subspecies are now considered synonyms of Hexaplex duplex.

- Hexaplex duplex duplex (Röding, 1798) – synonyms: Murex eurystomus Swainson, 1833; Murex hoplites Fischer, 1876; Murex minima Dautzenberg, 1910; Murex saxatilis Linnaeus (auctt.); Purpura duplex Röding, 1798
- Hexaplex duplex canariensis (Nordsieck, 1975) – synonyms: Murex turbinatus Lamarck, 1822; Trunculariopsis canariensis Nordsieck, 1975

== Description ==
The length of the shell varies between 30 and 229 millimetres (1.2 and 9.0 in). It contains six to eight varices. These are singly spinous, the spines somewhat frondose, those on the shoulder of the whorls usually larger and curved. There are no interstitial ribs. The color of the shell is light yellowish brown, usually more or less pink-banded. The aperture is pink, with three or four darker bands.

== Distribution ==
This species occurs in the Red Sea and in the Atlantic Ocean off the Cape Verdes and the Canary Islands; and from Senegal to Angola. It has also been described as Murex turbinatus from the Mediterranean Sea.
