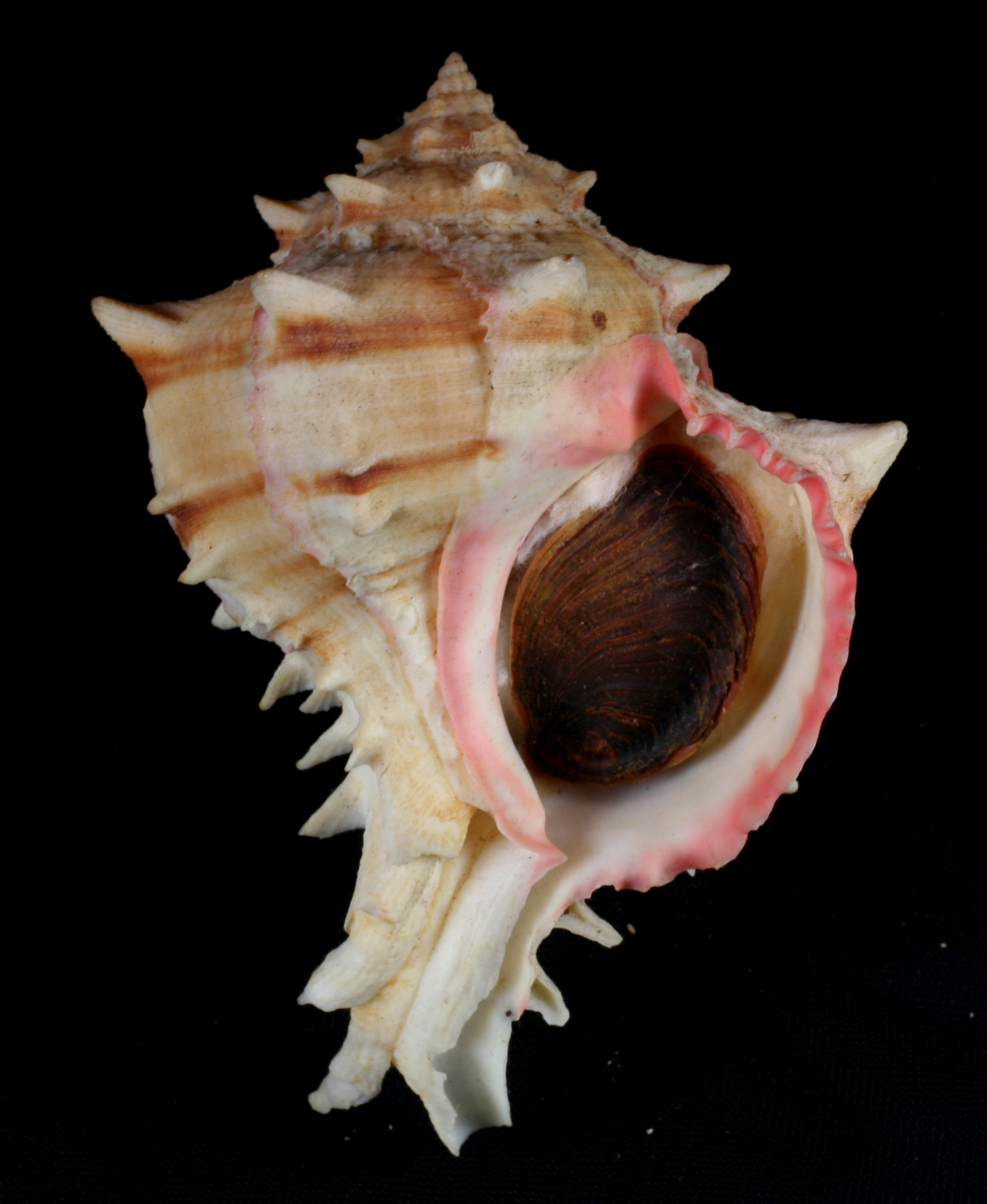
- Shell of Hexaplex brassica (Lamarck, 1822), with operculum, measuring 102.4 mm in height, collected at Taboga Island, in Panama.

Scientific classification
- Kingdom: Animalia
- Phylum: Mollusca
- Class: Gastropoda
- Subclass: Caenogastropoda
- Order: Neogastropoda
- Family: Muricidae
- Genus: Hexaplex
- Species: H. brassica

Binomial name
- Hexaplex brassica (Lamarck, 1822)

Synonyms
- Murex brassica Lamarck, 1822; Murex ducalis Broderip & Sowerby, 1829; Murex rhodocheilus King & Broderip, 1832

= Hexaplex brassica =

Species of gastropod

Hexaplex brassica is a species of sea snail, a marine gastropod mollusk in the family Muricidae, the murex snails or rock snails.

== Distribution ==
This species is found offshore in depths to 55 m from Guaymas, in Mexico, south to Peru, and is more commonly indigenous to Costa Rica.
