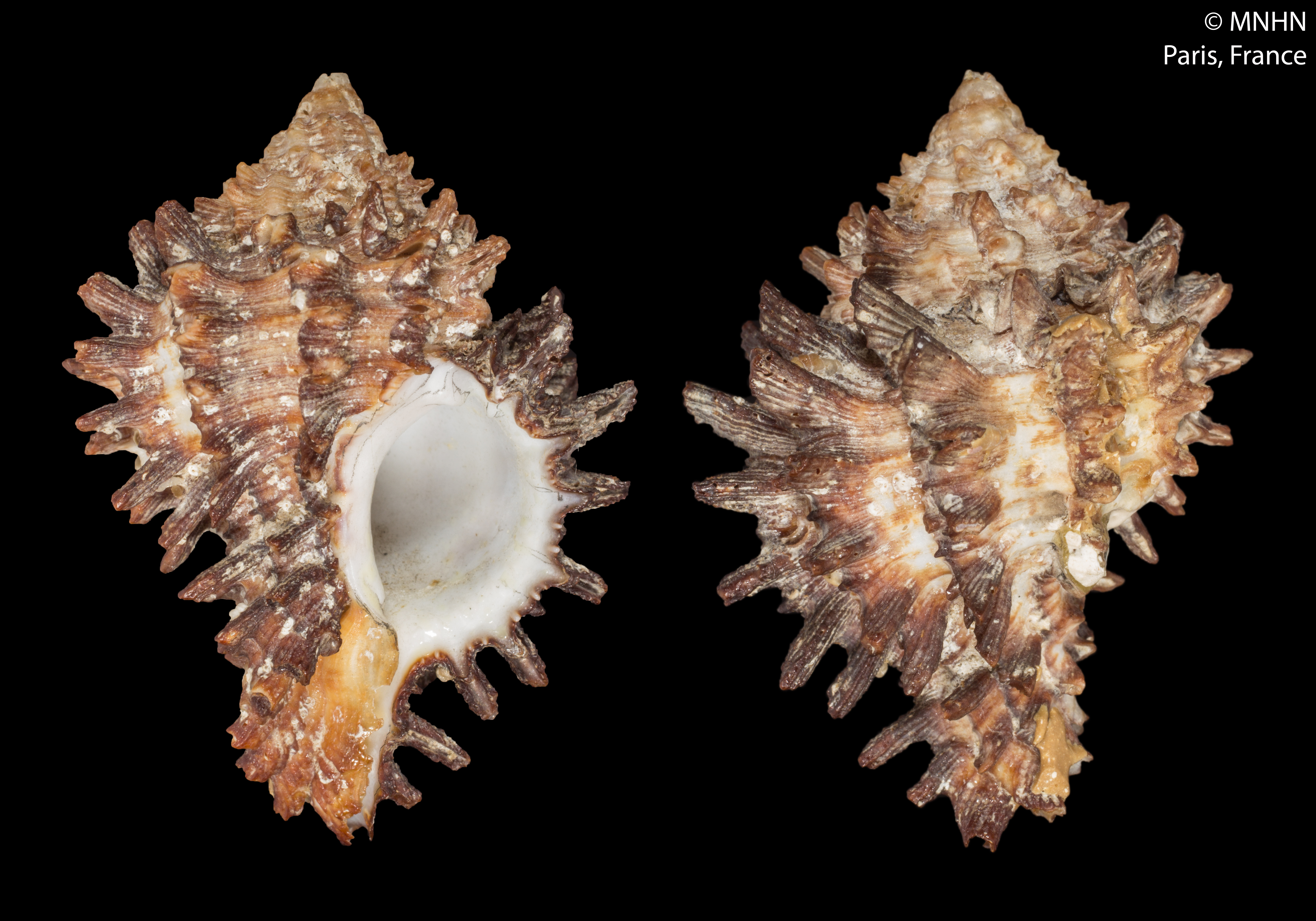

Scientific classification
- Kingdom: Animalia
- Phylum: Mollusca
- Class: Gastropoda
- Subclass: Caenogastropoda
- Order: Neogastropoda
- Family: Muricidae
- Genus: Hexaplex
- Species: H. angularis

Binomial name
- Hexaplex angularis (Lamarck, 1822)

Synonyms
- Hexaplex (Trunculariopsis) angularis (Lamarck, 1822)· accepted, alternate representation; Murex adamsi Sowerby II, 1879; Murex angularis Lamarck, 1822; Murex densus H. & A. Adams, 1853; Murex goniophorus Euthyme, 1889; Murex hirsutus Poirier, 1883; Murex inornatus A. Adams, 1853; Murex lyratus A. Adams, 1853; Murex octonus Sowerby II, 1834; Murex pudicus Reeve, 1845; Murex tenuis Sowerby II, 1879

= Hexaplex angularis =

Species of gastropod

Hexaplex angularis is a species of sea snail, a marine gastropod mollusc in the family Muricidae, the murex snails or rock snails.
