= Hexaplex megacerus =

Scientific classification
- Kingdom: Animalia
- Phylum: Mollusca
- Class: Gastropoda
- Subclass: Caenogastropoda
- Order: Neogastropoda
- Family: Muricidae
- Genus: Hexaplex
- Species: H. megacerus

Binomial name
- Hexaplex megacerus (G.B. Sowerby II, 1834)

Synonyms
- Murex megacerus Sowerby, 1834; Murex moquinianus Duval, 1853

Species of gastropod

Hexaplex megacerus is a species of sea snail, a marine gastropod mollusk in the family Muricidae, the murex snails or rock snails.
