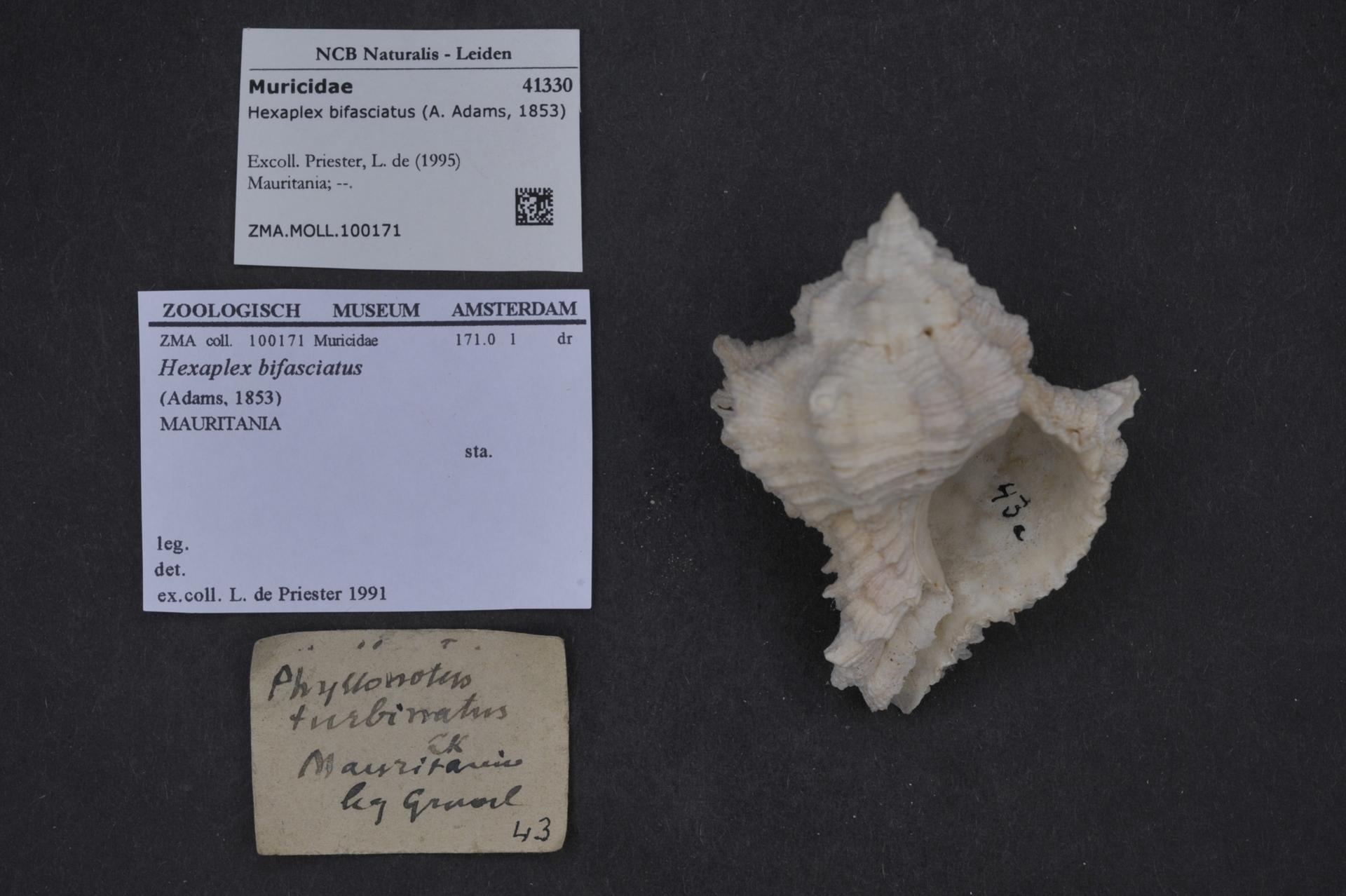
- Hexaplex bifasciatus (A. Adams, 1853)

Scientific classification
- Kingdom: Animalia
- Phylum: Mollusca
- Class: Gastropoda
- Subclass: Caenogastropoda
- Order: Neogastropoda
- Family: Muricidae
- Genus: Hexaplex
- Subgenus: Trunculariopsis
- Species: H. bifasciatus

Binomial name
- Hexaplex bifasciatus (A. Adams, 1853)

Synonyms
- Murex bifasciatus A. Adams, 1853

= Hexaplex bifasciatus =

Species of gastropod

Hexaplex bifasciatus is a species of sea snail, a marine gastropod mollusk in the family Muricidae, the murex snails or rock snails. It is included in the subgenus Trunculariopsis.
