= Hexaplex conatus =

Scientific classification
- Kingdom: Animalia
- Phylum: Mollusca
- Class: Gastropoda
- Subclass: Caenogastropoda
- Order: Neogastropoda
- Family: Muricidae
- Genus: Hexaplex
- Species: H. conatus

Binomial name
- Hexaplex conatus (McMichael, 1964)

Synonyms
- Murexsul conatus McMichael, 1964

Species of gastropod

Hexaplex conatus is a species of sea snail, a marine gastropod mollusk in the family Muricidae, the murex snails or rock snails.
