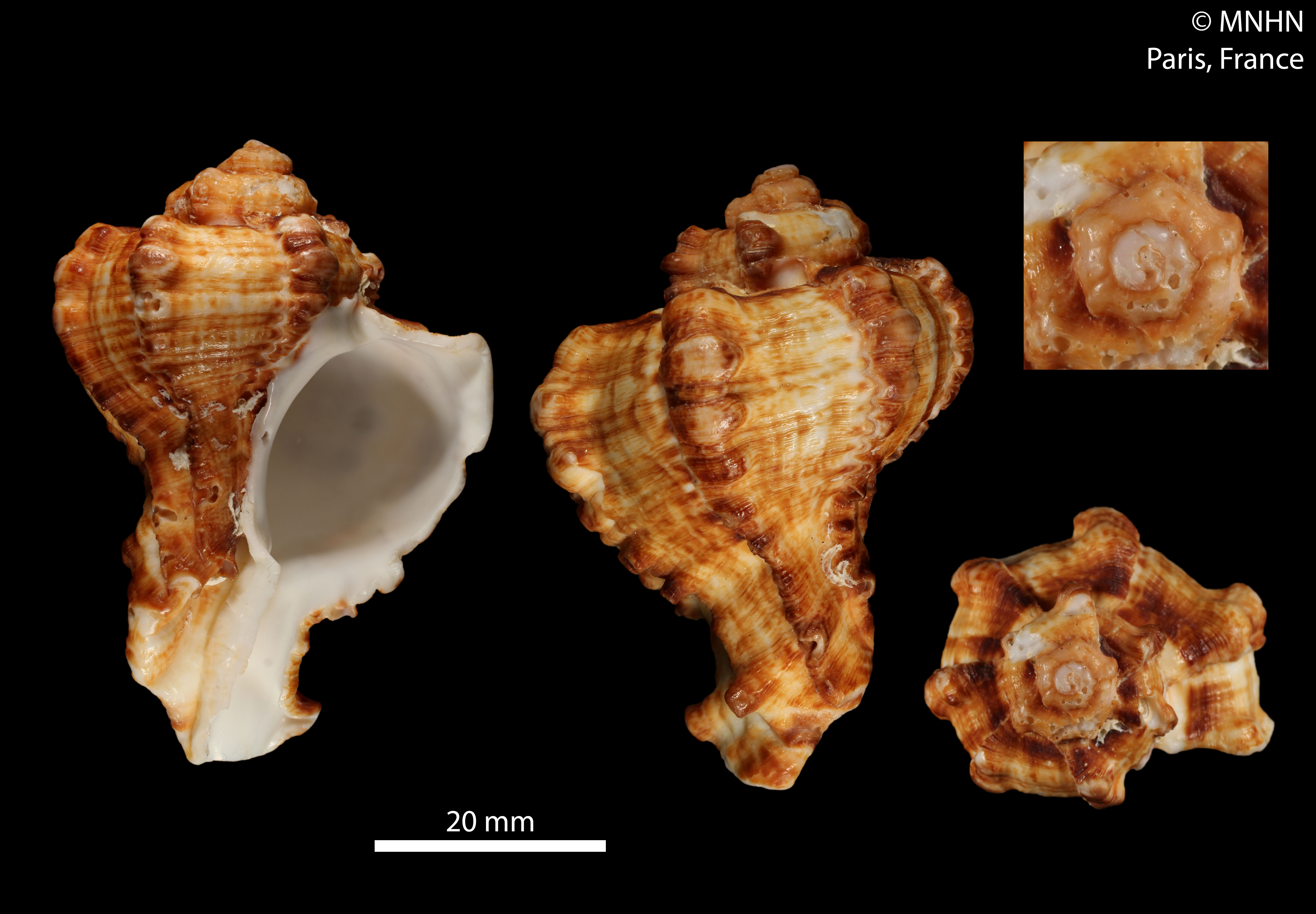

Scientific classification
- Kingdom: Animalia
- Phylum: Mollusca
- Class: Gastropoda
- Subclass: Caenogastropoda
- Order: Neogastropoda
- Family: Muricidae
- Genus: Hexaplex
- Species: H. kuesterianus

Binomial name
- Hexaplex kuesterianus (Tapparone-Canefri, 1875)

Synonyms
- Hexaplex (Hexaplex) kuesterianus (Tapparone Canefri, 1875)· accepted, alternate representation; Hexaplex (Hexaplex) kusterianus (Tapparone-Canefri, 1875); Hexaplex kusterianus (misspelling); Murex kuesterianus Tapparone Canefri, 1875 (original combination); Murex kusterianus Tapparone-Canefri, 1875 (basionym); Murex spinosus A. Adams, 1853; Muricanthus kusterianus (Tapparone-Canefri, 1875)

= Hexaplex kuesterianus =

Species of gastropod

Hexaplex kuesterianus is a species of sea snail, a marine gastropod mollusk in the family Muricidae, the murex snails or rock snails.

== Subspecies ==
- Hexaplex kuesterianus blazeki T. Cossignani, 2017
- Hexaplex kuesterianus bozzadamii (Franchi, 1990)
- Hexaplex kuesterianus kuesterianus (Tapparone-Canefri, 1875)
