= Hexaplex pecchiolianus =

Scientific classification
- Kingdom: Animalia
- Phylum: Mollusca
- Class: Gastropoda
- Subclass: Caenogastropoda
- Order: Neogastropoda
- Family: Muricidae
- Genus: Hexaplex
- Species: H. pecchiolianus

Binomial name
- Hexaplex pecchiolianus (d'Ancona, 1871)

Species of gastropod

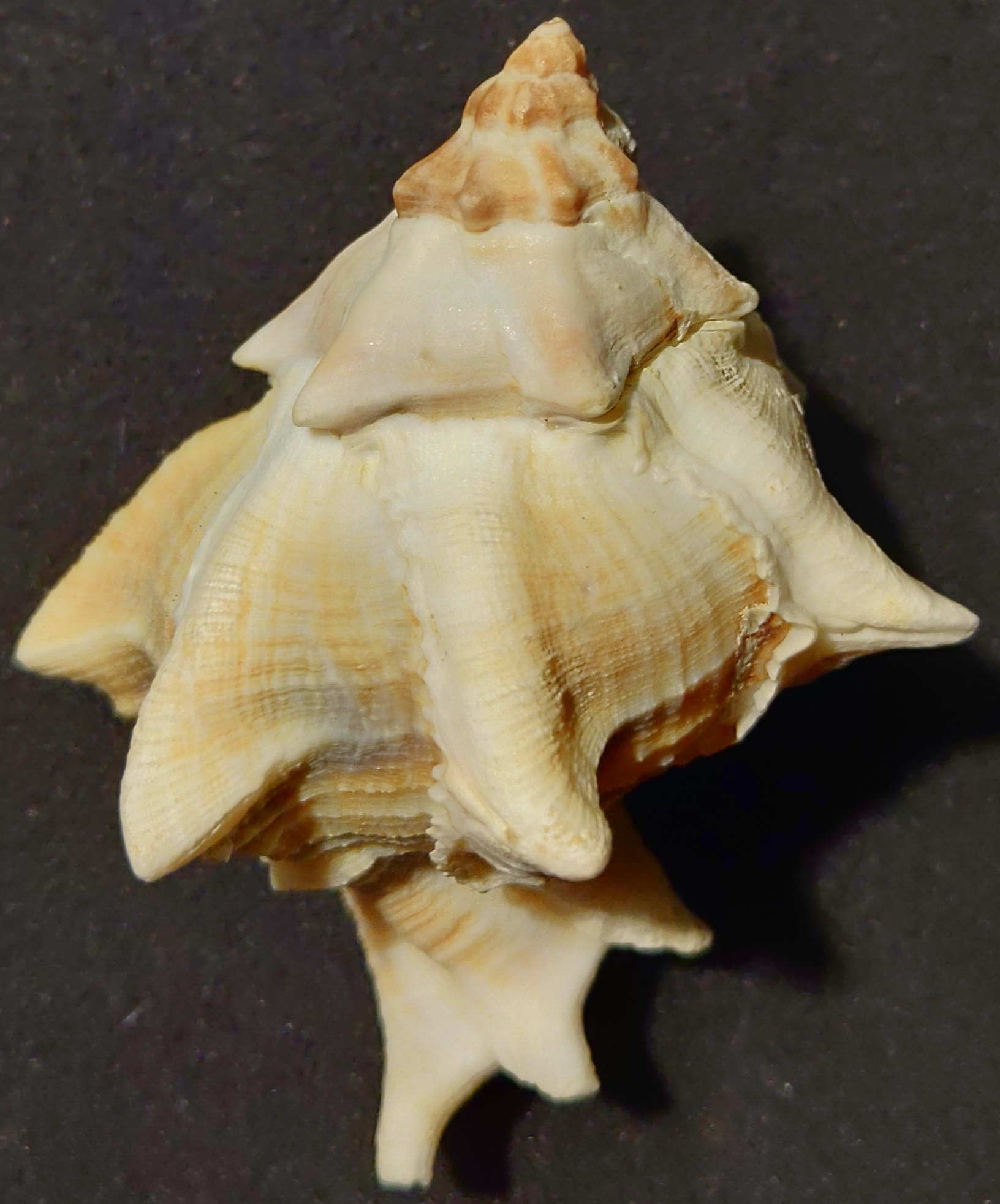
Hexaplex Pecchiolianus

Hexaplex pecchiolianus is a species of sea snail, a marine gastropod mollusk in the family Muricidae, the murex snails or rock snails.
