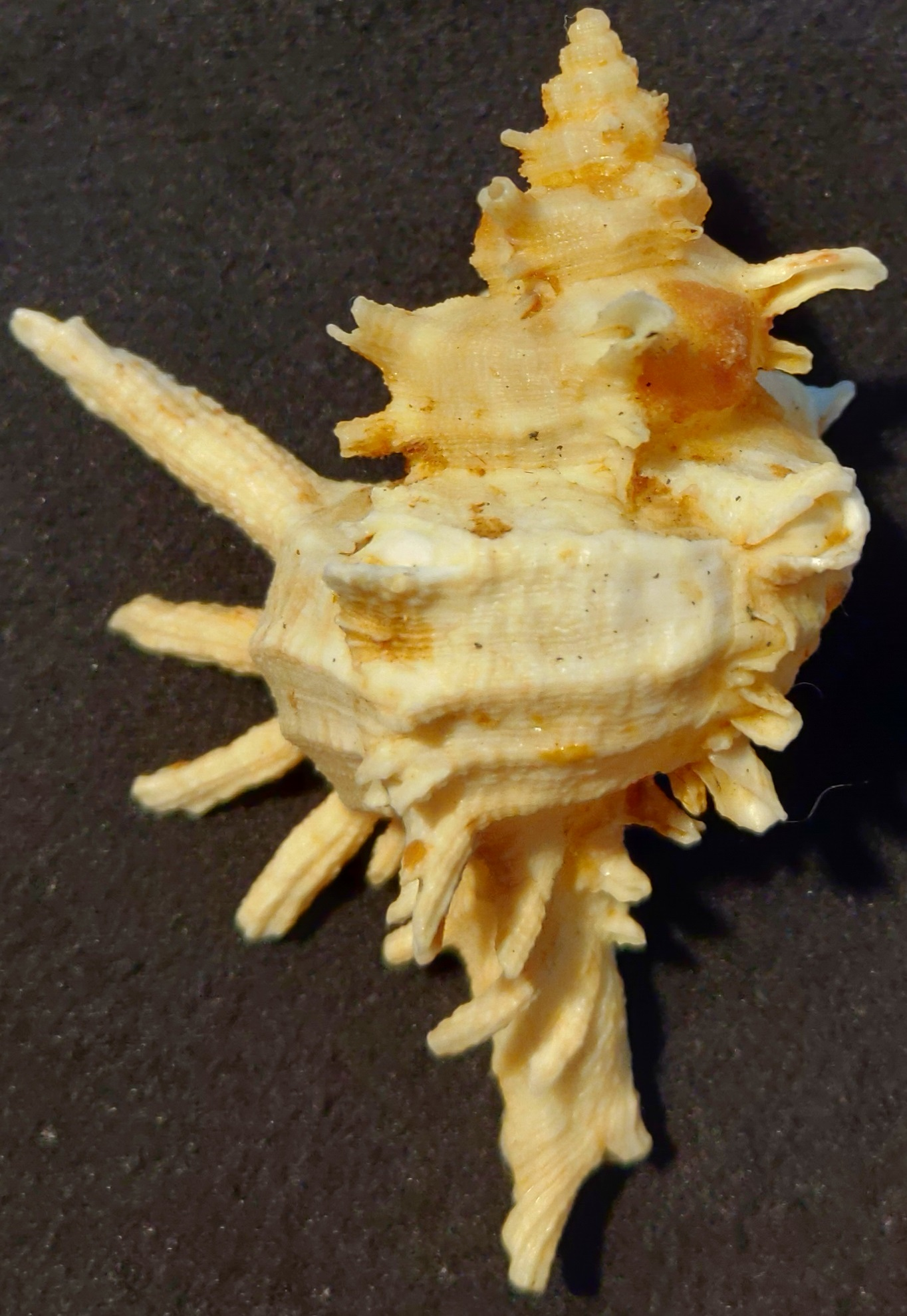

Scientific classification
- Kingdom: Animalia
- Phylum: Mollusca
- Class: Gastropoda
- Subclass: Caenogastropoda
- Order: Neogastropoda
- Family: Muricidae
- Genus: Hexaplex
- Species: H. saharicus

Binomial name
- Hexaplex saharicus (Locard, 1897)

Synonyms
- Hexaplex (Trunculariopsis) saharicus (Locard, 1897)· accepted, alternate representation; Hexaplex (Trunculariopsis) saharicus saharicus (Locard, 1897)· accepted, alternate representation; Hexaplex saharicus saharicus (Locard, 1897)· accepted, alternate representation; Murex saharicus Locard, 1897 (original combination)

= Hexaplex saharicus =

Species of gastropod

Hexaplex saharicus is a species of sea snail, a marine gastropod mollusk in the family Muricidae, the murex snails or rock snails.

Suvspecies

- Hexaplex saharicus ryalli Houart, 1993

== Distribution ==
This species occurs in the Atlantic Ocean off Southern Morocco and Ivory Coast.
