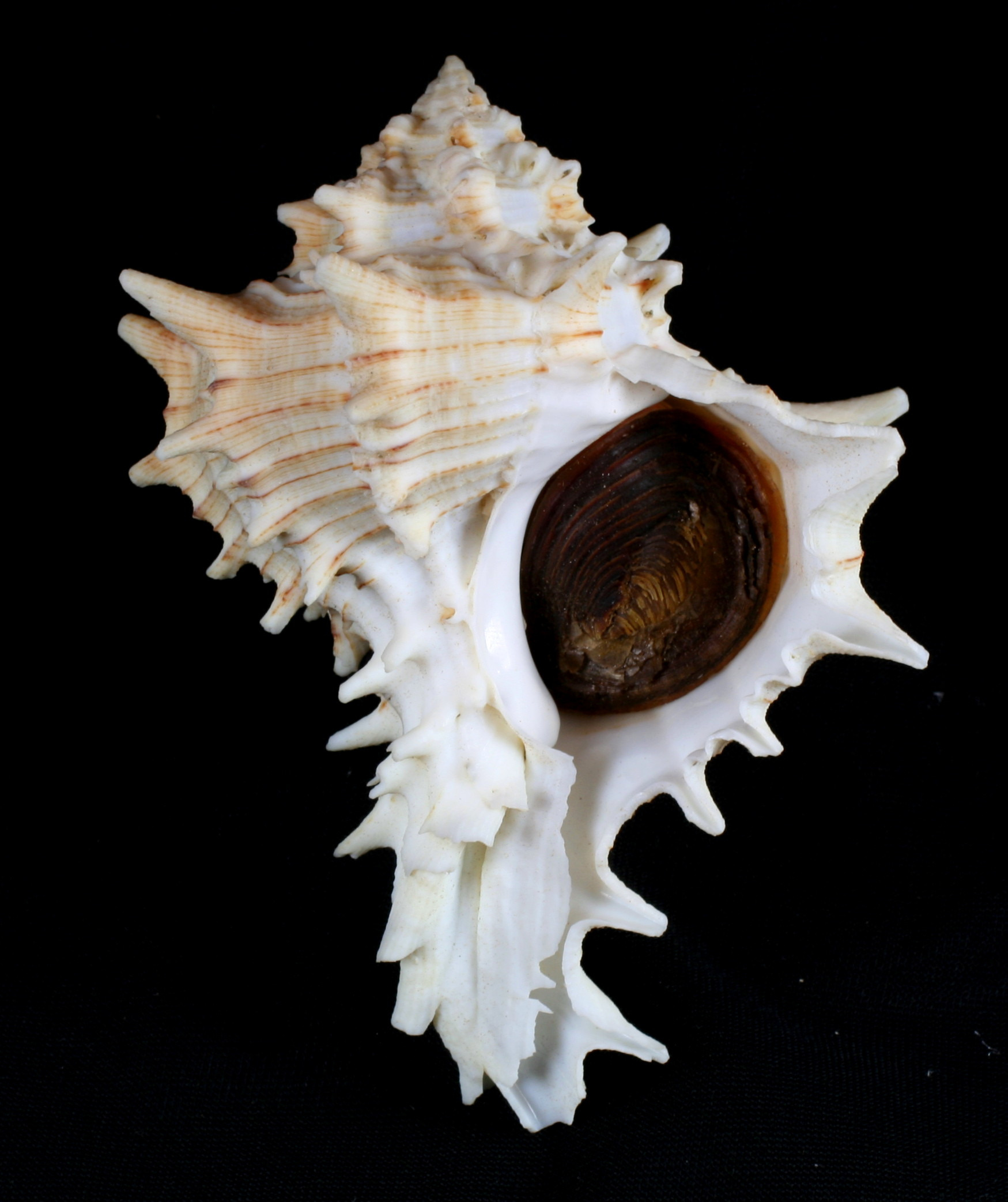
- Shell of Hexaplex fulvescens (Sowerby, 1834), with operculum, measuring 116.9 mm in height, off Brownsville, in Texas.

Scientific classification
- Kingdom: Animalia
- Phylum: Mollusca
- Class: Gastropoda
- Subclass: Caenogastropoda
- Order: Neogastropoda
- Family: Muricidae
- Genus: Hexaplex
- Species: H. fulvescens

Binomial name
- Hexaplex fulvescens (Sowerby II, 1834)

Synonyms
- Hexaplex (Muricanthus) fulvescens (G. B. Sowerby II, 1834)· accepted, alternate representation; Hexaplex (Trunculariopsis) fulvescens (G. B. Sowerby II, 1834)· accepted, alternate representation; Hexaplex punctuata Perry, 1811 (nomen oblitum); Murex burryi Clench & Farfante, 1945; Murex fulvescens Sowerby II, 1834; Murex spinicosta Valenciennes in Kiener, 1843; Muricanthus trippae Petuch, 1991

= Hexaplex fulvescens =

Species of gastropod

Hexaplex fulvescens, the giant eastern murex or giant Atlantic murex or tawny murex, is a species of sea snail, a marine gastropod mollusk in the family Muricidae, the murex snails or rock snails.

== Distribution ==
This species is native to the western Atlantic Ocean from North Carolina to Cape Canaveral, Florida and it is also present in the Gulf of Mexico from Florida west to Texas.

== Habitat ==
These quite uncommon sea snails live at depths of 0 to 80 m. In fact, they commonly can be found in deeper waters, but they can also be found in shallow inshore waters. Commercial scallop operations out of Florida sometimes trawl this species in 100 - 120 feet depth.

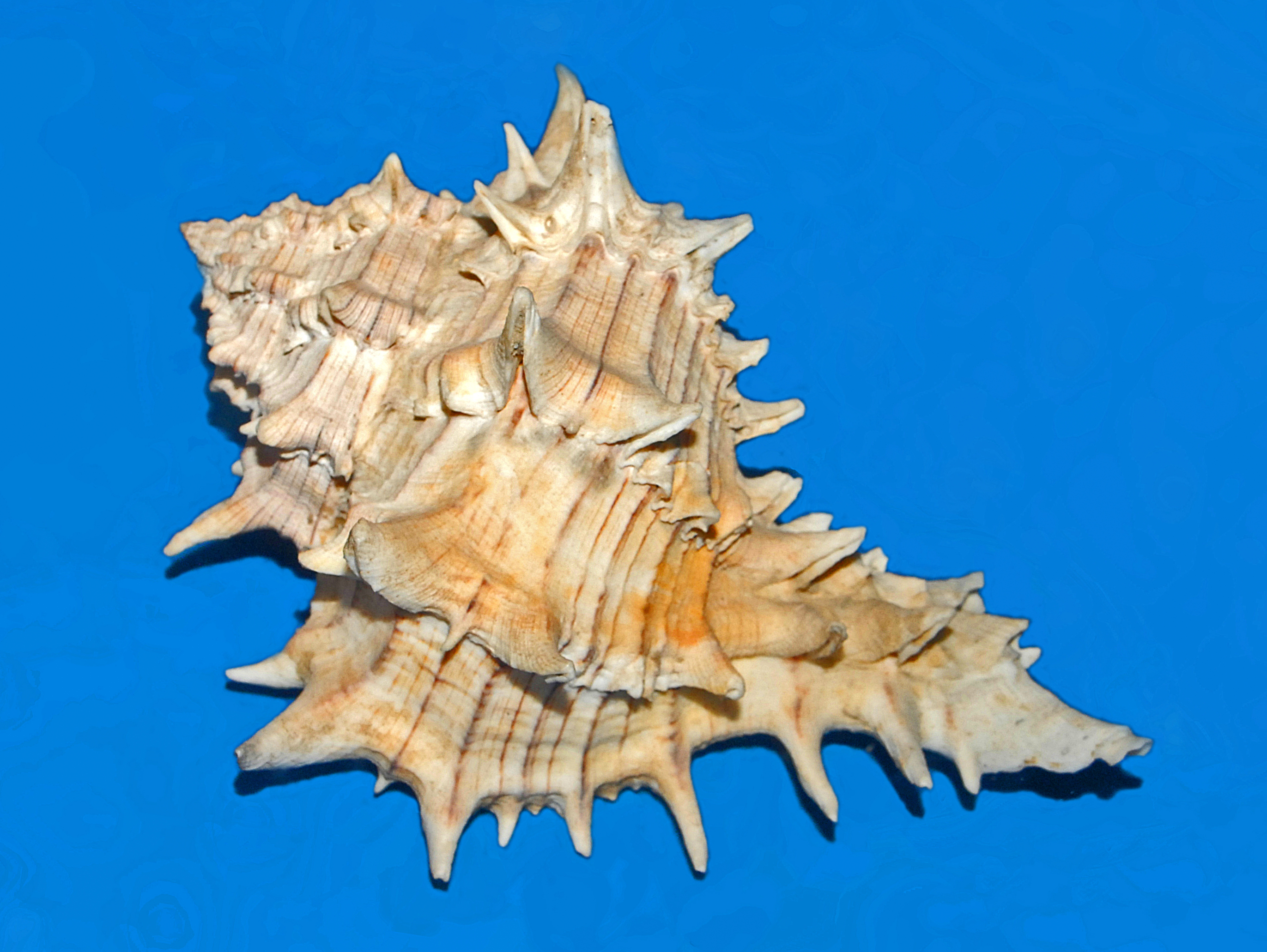
A shell of Hexaplex fulvescens from the Antilles

== Description ==
Shells of Hexaplex fulvescens can reach a size of 60–223 millimetres (2.4–8.8 in). These snails are massive and spinose and they are the largest muricid snails of the Western Atlantic (hence the common name). They have several straight or bifurcate spines arranged in 6-10 radial rows with spiraling ridges. Snail surface may be whitish, grayish or pale brown, the aperture is oval with crenulate edges. The siphonal canal is short.

== Biology ==
Hexaplex fulvescens are active predators on other mollusks (mussels, oysters and clams). They lay their eggs in capsules attached under rocks.

== Bibliography ==
- G. E. Radwin - Murex Shells of the World: An Illustrated Guide to the Muricidae
- National Audubon Society Field Guide to North American Seashells
- Turgeon, D. D., J. F. Quinn Jr., A. E. Bogan, E. V. Coan, F. G. Hochberg, W. G. Lyons, et al. (1998) Common and scientific names of aquatic invertebrates from the United States and Canada: Mollusks, 2nd ed., American Fisheries Society Special Publication 26
