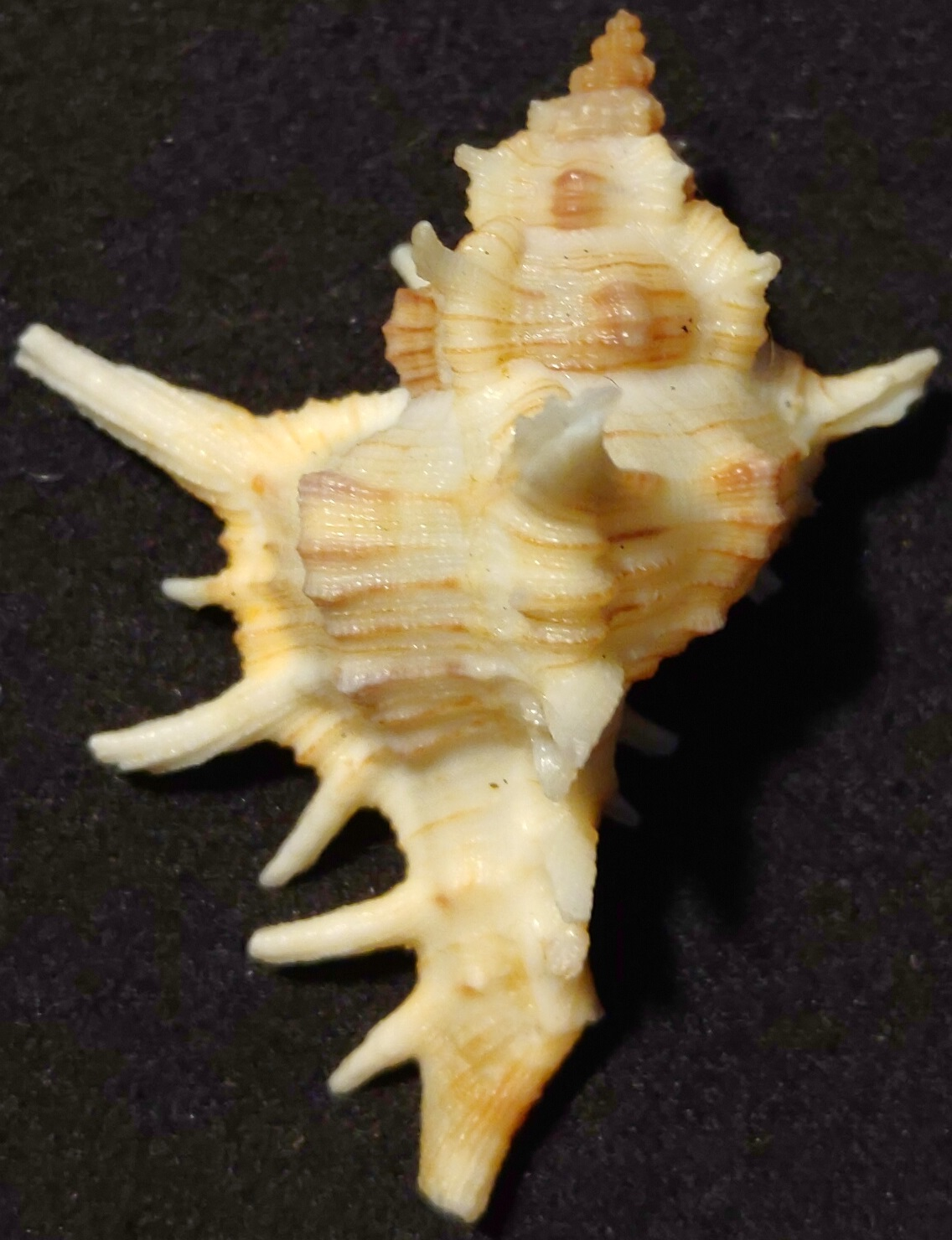

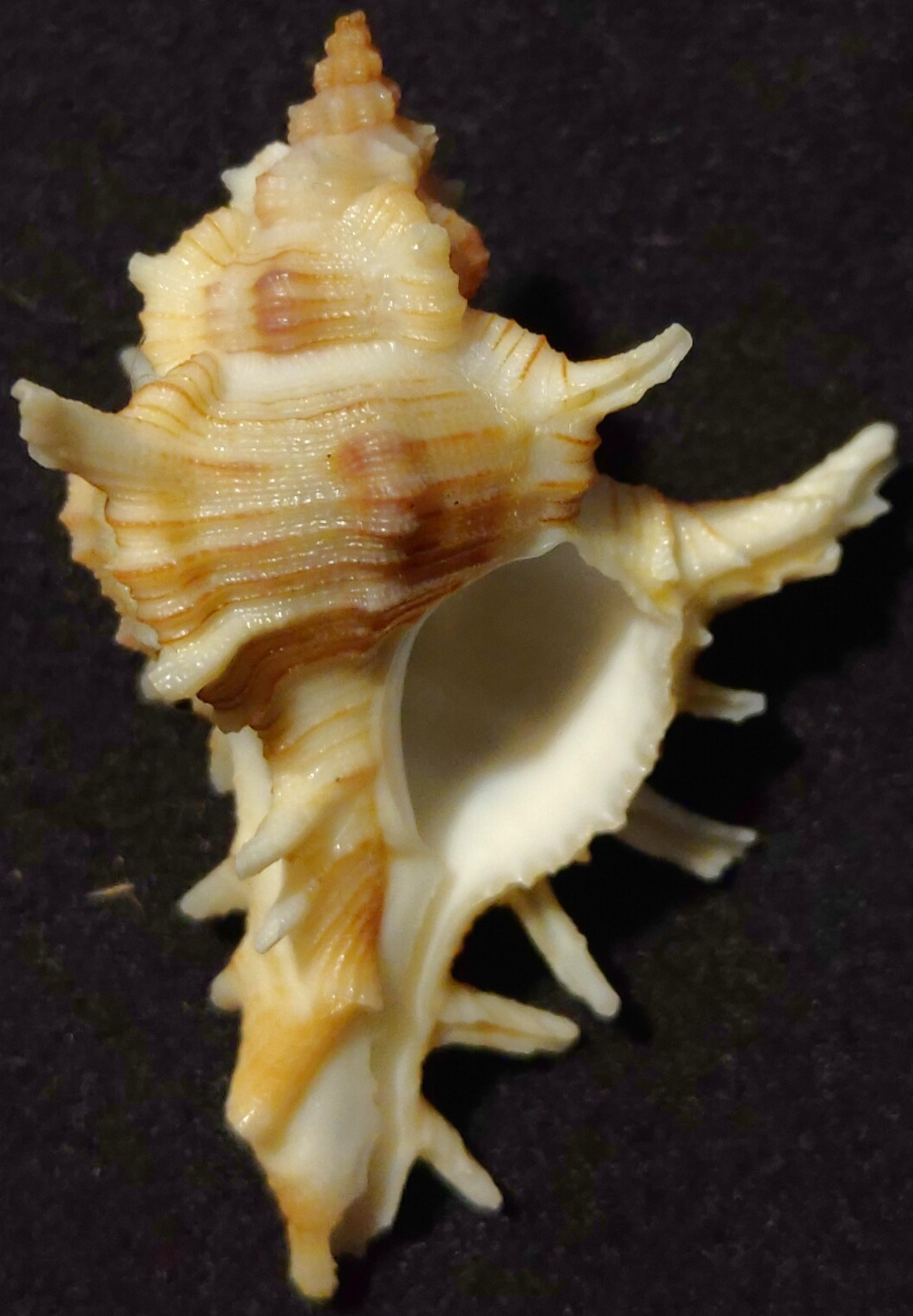

Scientific classification
- Kingdom: Animalia
- Phylum: Mollusca
- Class: Gastropoda
- Subclass: Caenogastropoda
- Order: Neogastropoda
- Family: Muricidae
- Genus: Chicoreus
- Species: C. varius

Binomial name
- Chicoreus varius (Sowerby II, 1834)

Synonyms
- Chicoreus (Triplex) varius (G.B. Sowerby II, 1834); Chicoreus clausii (Dunker, 1879); Hexaplex (Trunculariopsis) varius (G.B. Sowerby II, 1834); Hexaplex (Trunculariopsis) varius clausii (Dunker, 1879); Hexaplex varius (G. B. Sowerby II, 1834); Murex clausii Dunker, 1879; Murex varius G. B. Sowerby II, 1834 (original combination); Murex varius var. inops Dautzenberg, 1891; Muricanthus varius (Sowerby II, 1834)

= Chicoreus varius =

Species of gastropod

Chicoreus varius is a species of sea snail, a marine gastropod mollusk in the family Muricidae, the murex snails or rock snails.

== Description ==
The shell size varies between 29 mm and 65 mm

== Distribution ==
This species occurs in the Atlantic Ocean off Angola.
