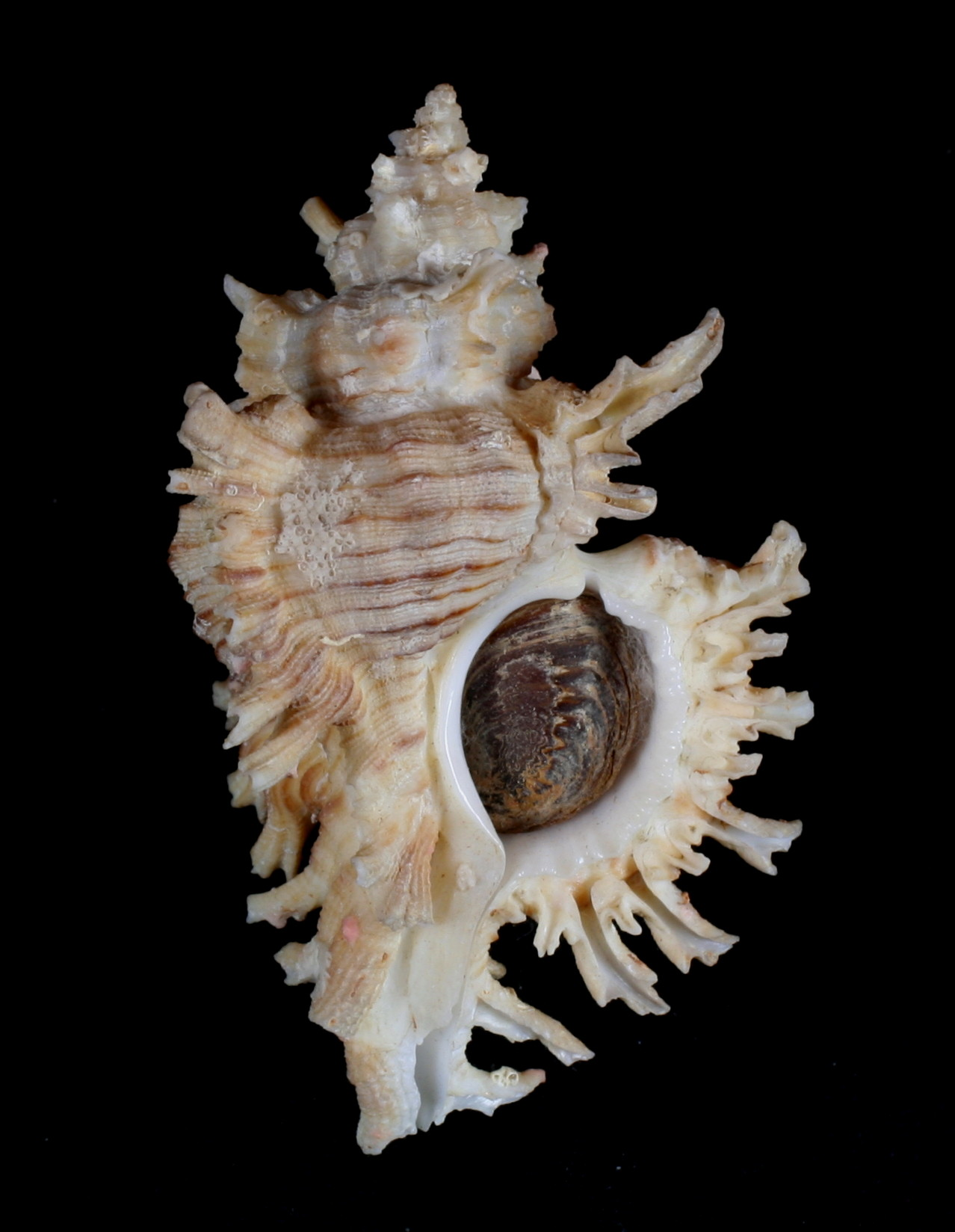

Scientific classification
- Kingdom: Animalia
- Phylum: Mollusca
- Class: Gastropoda
- Subclass: Caenogastropoda
- Order: Neogastropoda
- Family: Muricidae
- Genus: Hexaplex
- Species: H. rosarium

Binomial name
- Hexaplex rosarium (Röding, 1798)

Synonyms
- Hexaplex (Trunculariopsis) rosarium (Röding, 1798)· accepted, alternate representation; Murex ananus Hinds, 1844; Murex beckii Philippi, 1847; Murex melonulus Lamarck, 1822; Murex sowerbianus Poirier, 1883; Purpura imperialis Schumacher, 1817; Purpura rosarium Röding, 1798

= Hexaplex rosarium =

Species of gastropod

Hexaplex rosarium, commonly known as the rosy-mouth murex, is a species of sea snail, a marine gastropod mollusk in the family Muricidae, the murex snails or rock snails.

== Description ==
The size of an adult shell varies between 50 millimetres (2.0 in) and 100 millimetres (3.9 in).

== Reproduction ==
The rosy-mouth murex reproduces through sexual reproduction.

== Distribution ==
This species occurs in the Atlantic Ocean from Cape Verde to Angola.
