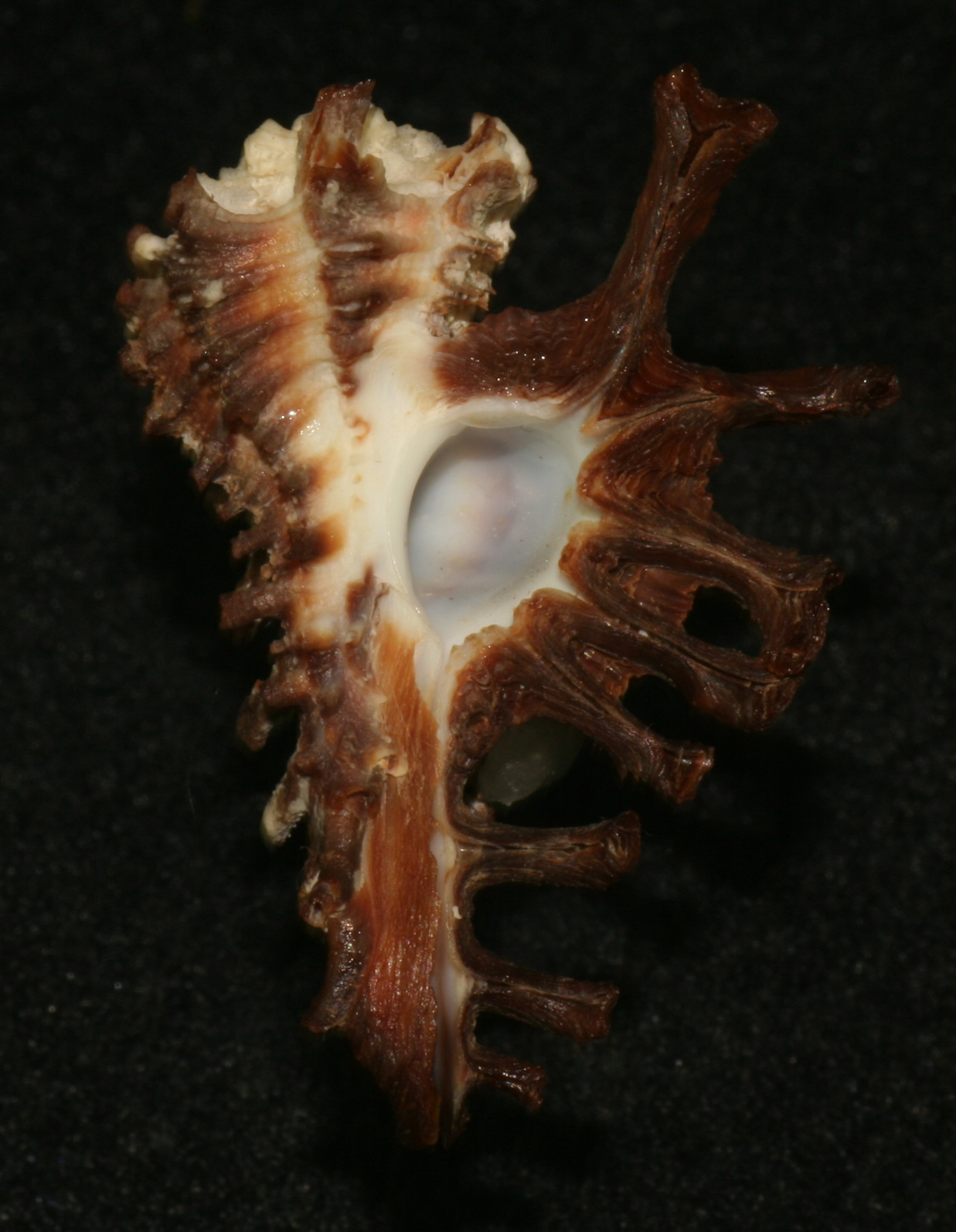
- Shell of Homalocantha scorpio (Linnaeus, 1758), 35.6 mm in length, dredged off Mandawe, Cebu, Philippines

Scientific classification
- Kingdom: Animalia
- Phylum: Mollusca
- Class: Gastropoda
- Subclass: Caenogastropoda
- Order: Neogastropoda
- Family: Muricidae
- Genus: Homalocantha
- Species: H. scorpio

Binomial name
- Homalocantha scorpio (Linnaeus, 1758)

Synonyms
- Hexaplex fusca Perry, 1811; Hexaplex tenuis Perry, 1811; Murex scorpio Linnaeus, 1758

= Homalocantha scorpio =

Species of gastropod

Homalocantha scorpio, common name the scorpion murex, is a species of sea snail, a marine gastropod mollusk in the family Muricidae, the murex snails or rock snails.
