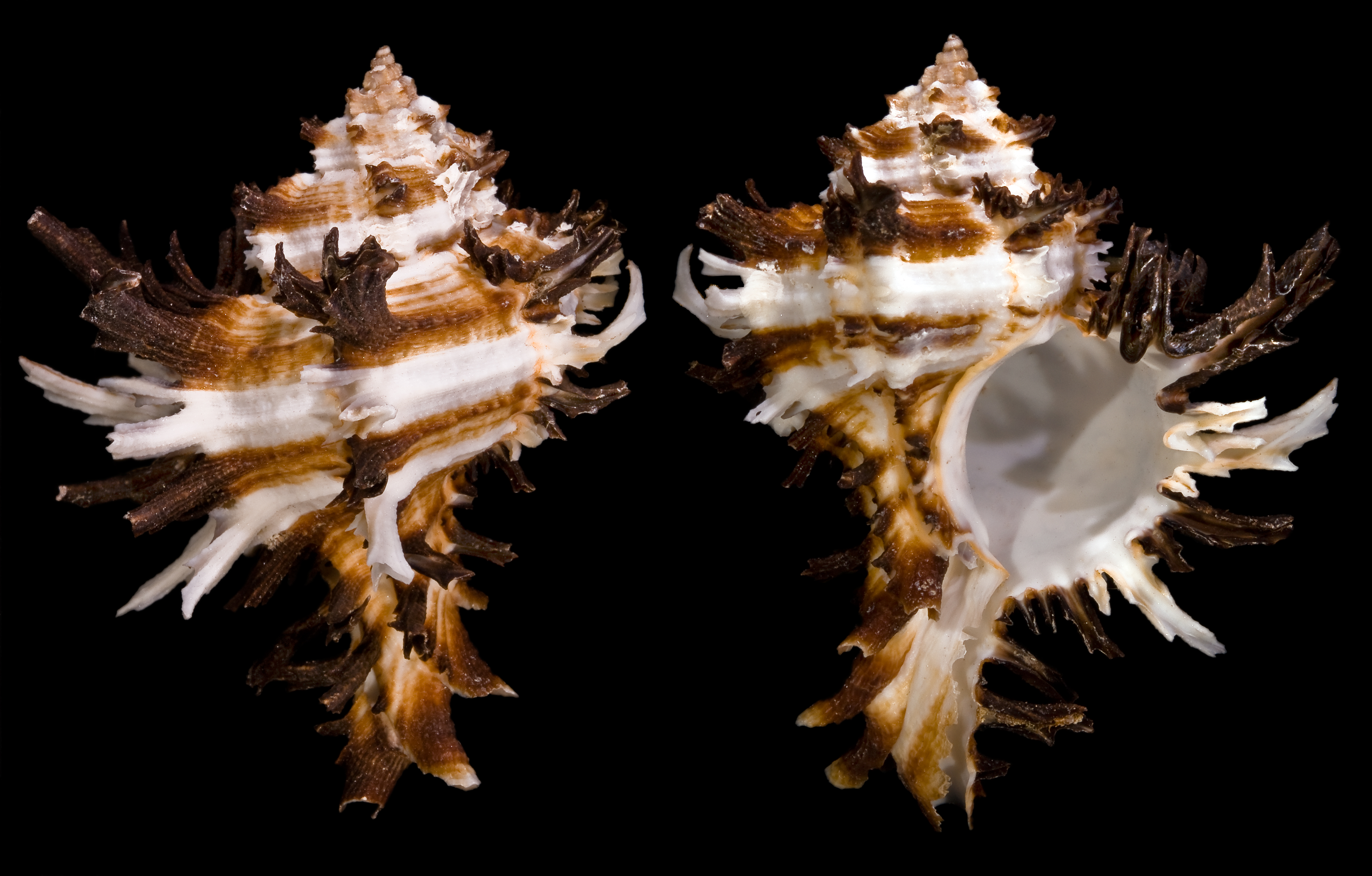
- Dorsal and ventral view

Scientific classification
- Kingdom: Animalia
- Phylum: Mollusca
- Class: Gastropoda
- Subclass: Caenogastropoda
- Order: Neogastropoda
- Family: Muricidae
- Genus: Hexaplex
- Species: H. cichoreum

Binomial name
- Hexaplex cichoreum (Gmelin, 1791)

Synonyms
- List: Chicoreus cichoreum (Gmelin, 1791); Hexaplex foliacea Perry, 1811; Hexaplex foliata Perry, 1811; Hexaplex (Hexaplex) cichoreum (Gmelin, 1791); Murex cichoreum Gmelin, 1791; Murex depressospinosus Dunker, 1869; Murex diaphanus Gmelin, 1791; Murex endivia Lamarck, 1822; Murex endivia var. albicans Tryon, 1880; Murex fasciatus Gmelin, 1791; Murex radicula Menke, 1828; Murex saxicola Broderip, 1825

= Hexaplex cichoreum =

Species of gastropod

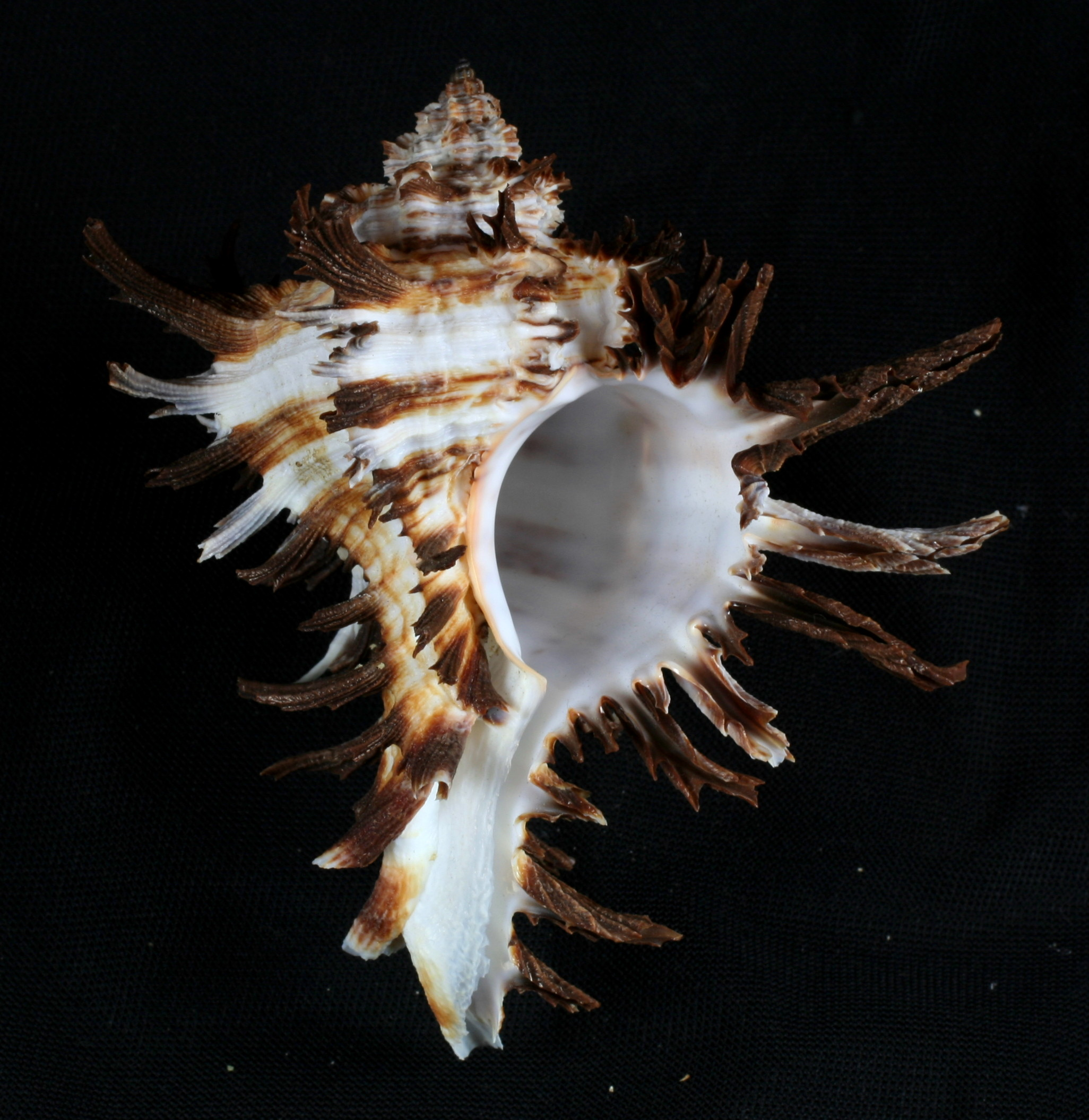
Shell of Hexaplex cichoreum (Gmelin, 1791), measuring 95.6 mm in height.

Hexaplex cichoreum, common name the "endive murex", is a medium-sized species of sea snail, a marine gastropod mollusk in the family Muricidae, the murex shells or rock snails.

== Description ==
The height of the oblong, fusiform shell varies between 50 mm and 150 mm. The short spire of the shell consists of eight to nine ventricose whorls that become flat-shouldered and thick with age. They are transversely ridged and striated. They show six to seven frondose varices, with the fronds elevated and recurved. The umbilicus is rather large and deep. Its color is yellowish-brown, frequently banded with a darker tint. The fronds are usually dark brown or blackish. The white, almost round aperture has a rather long, open posterior siphonal canal that gradually widens, but is narrow and turns to the right at the beginning. lips are tinged with pink. There is also an all-white variety (var. albicans) from the Philippines.

== Distribution ==
This sea snail distribution is restricted to the West Pacific. Regions where it is found include Indonesia, Papua New Guinea and the Philippines.
