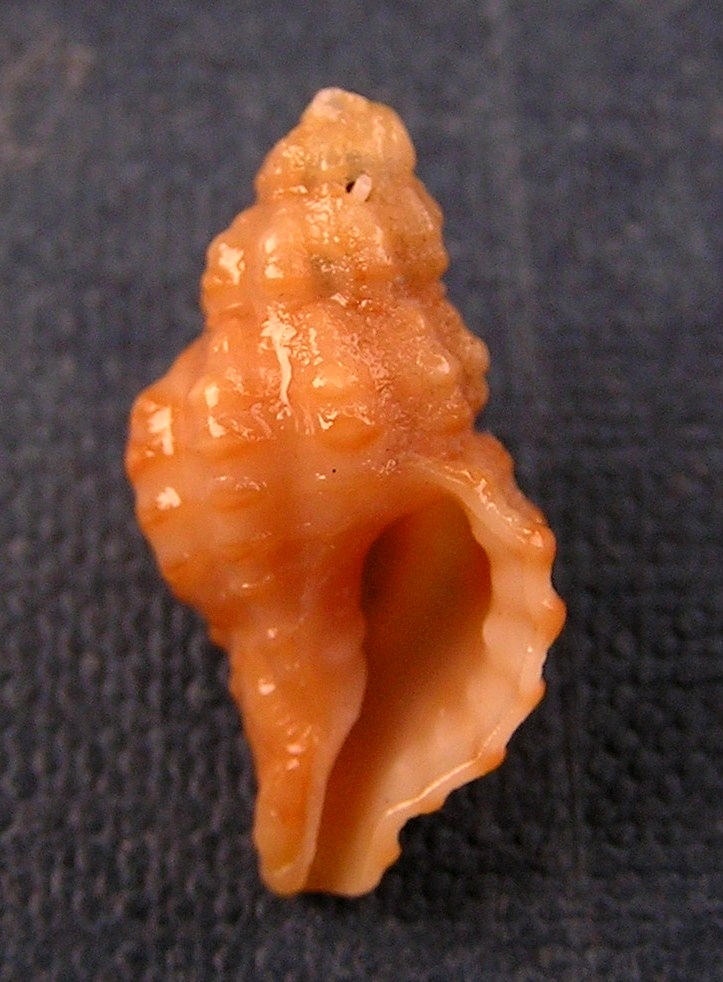
- Apertural view the shell of Muricopsis necocheana

Scientific classification
- Kingdom: Animalia
- Phylum: Mollusca
- Class: Gastropoda
- Subclass: Caenogastropoda
- Order: Neogastropoda
- Family: Muricidae
- Subfamily: Muricopsinae
- Genus: Muricopsis; Bucquoy & Dautzenberg, 1882

Type species
- Murex blainvillii Payraudeau, 1826

Species
- See text

Synonyms
- Murex (Muricopsis) Bucquoy & Dautzenberg, 1882 (original rank); Muricopsis (Muricopsis) Bucquoy & Dautzenberg, 1882· accepted, alternate representation; Muricopsis (Risomurex) Olsson & McGinty, 1958· accepted, alternate representation; Risomurex Olsson & McGinty, 1958

= Muricopsis =

Genus of gastropods

Muricopsis is a genus of small predatory sea snails, marine gastropod mollusks in the rock snail family, Muricidae.

== Species ==
According to the World Register of Marine Species (WoRMS), the following species with accepted names are included within the genus Muricopsis :

- †Muricopsis acuticostatus Staadt, 1913
- Muricopsis annobonensis Houart & Rolán, 2001
- Muricopsis barbarae Garrigues & Lamy, 2019
- Muricopsis caribbaea (Bartsch & Rehder, 1939)
- Muricopsis chiarae Bozzetti, 1991
- Muricopsis corallinus Garrigues & Lamy, 2019
- Muricopsis cristata (Brocchi, 1814)
- Muricopsis deformis (Reeve, 1846)
- Muricopsis delemarrei Houart, 2005
- †Muricopsis dujardini Peyrot, 1938
- Muricopsis fusiformis (Gmelin, 1791)
- †Muricopsis galbensis (P. Jung, 1969)
- Muricopsis ghisottii Cecalupo, Buzzurro & Mariani, 2008
- Muricopsis gilbertharrisi (Weisbord, 1962)
- Muricopsis gofasi Houart, 1993
- Muricopsis gorii Houart, 2012
- Muricopsis guadalupensis Garrigues & Merle, 2014
- Muricopsis haidari Houart, 2003
- Muricopsis hernandezi Rolán & Gori, 2007
- Muricopsis honkeri Petuch, 2013
- Muricopsis josei Vokes, 1994
- Muricopsis leblondae Garrigues & Lamy, 2019
- Muricopsis linealbus Garrigues & Lamy, 2019
- Muricopsis marcusi Vokes, 1994
- Muricopsis matildeae Rolán & Fernandes, 1991
- Muricopsis mcleani Wiedrick, 2009
- Muricopsis necocheana (Pilsbry, 1900)
- Muricopsis omanensis Smythe & Oliver, 1986
- Muricopsis pauxilla (A. Adams, 1854)
- Muricopsis perexigua Vokes, 1994
- Muricopsis principensis Rolán & Fernandes, 1991
- Muricopsis rosea (Reeve, 1846)
- Muricopsis rutila (Reeve, 1846)
- Muricopsis schrammi (Crosse, 1863)
- Muricopsis seminolensis Vokes & Houart, 1986
- Muricopsis suga (Fischer-Piette, 1942)
- Muricopsis taupini Garrigues, 2016
- Muricopsis testorii Houart & Gori, 2008
- Muricopsis vassarti Houart, 2019
- Muricopsis westonensis Myers & D'Attilio, 1990
- Muricopsis withrowi Vokes & Houart, 1986
- Muricopsis zeteki Hertlein & A. M. Strong, 1951

Species brought into synonymy

- Muricopsis aliceae Petuch, 1987: synonym of Pygmaepterys aliceae (Petuch, 1987) (original combination)
- Muricopsis angolensis(Odhner, 1922): synonym of Orania fusulus (Brocchi, 1814)
- Muricopsis apiculata Dautzenberg, 1917: synonym of Ocinebrina edwardsii (Payraudeau, 1826): synonym of Ocenebra edwardsii (Payraudeau, 1826)
- Muricopsis aradasii(Poirier, 1883) synonym of Murexsul aradasii (Monterosato in Poirier, 1883)
- Muricopsis atra F. Nordsieck, 1972: synonym of Muricopsis cristata (Brocchi, 1814)
- Muricopsis blainvillii(Payraudeau, 1826): synonym of Muricopsis cristata (Brocchi, 1814)
- Muricopsis carnicolorBozzetti, 2009: synonym of Orania carnicolor (Bozzetti, 2009)
- Muricopsis carvalhoi Cox, 1936 †: synonym of Ocinebrina carvalhoi (Cox, 1936) †
- Muricopsis cevikeri Houart, 2000: synonym of Murexsul cevikeri (Houart, 2000) (original combination)
- Muricopsis cristatus (Brocchi, 1814): synonym of Muricopsis cristata (Brocchi, 1814)
- Muricopsis diadema (Aradas & Benoit, 1876): synonym of Murexsul aradasii (Monterosato in Poirier, 1883)
- Muricopsis duffyi Petuch, 1992: synonym of Murexsul huberti (Radwin & D'Attilio, 1976)
- Muricopsis edwardsii (Payraudeau, 1826): synonym of Ocinebrina edwardsii (Payraudeau, 1826): synonym of Ocenebra edwardsii (Payraudeau, 1826)
- Muricopsis erroneus (Monterosato in Poirier, 1883): synonym of Ocinebrina hispidula (Pallary, 1904): synonym of Ocenebra hispidula (Pallary, 1904)
- Muricopsis glutinosa Palazzi & Villari, 2001: synonym of Muricopsis cristata (Brocchi, 1814) (dubious synonym)
- Muricopsis hexagonus (Lamarck, 1816): synonym of Murexsul hexagonus (Lamarck, 1816): synonym of Murexsul pacaudi Van Hyfte & Danvin, 2018
- Muricopsis hispida Monterosato in Coen, 1933: synonym of Muricopsis cristata (Brocchi, 1814)
- Muricopsis hispidula (Pallary, 1904): synonym of Ocenebra hispidula (Pallary, 1904)
- Muricopsis hispidulus (Pallary, 1904): synonym of Ocenebra hispidula (Pallary, 1904)
- Muricopsis huberti Radwin & D'Attilio, 1976: synonym of Murexsul huberti (Radwin & D'Attilio, 1976) (original combination)
- Muricopsis hubrechti Bozzetti, 2018: synonym of Orania corallina (Melvill & Standen, 1903)
- Muricopsis ianlochiHouart, 1987: synonym of Murexsul ianlochi (Houart, 1987)
- Muricopsis inermis (Philippi, 1836): synonym of Muricopsis cristata (Brocchi, 1814)
- Muricopsis jaliscoensis Radwin & D'Attilio, 1970: synonym of Murexsul jaliscoensis (Radwin & D'Attilio, 1970) (original combination)
- Muricopsis lyonsi Petuch, 1986: synonym of Murexsul oxytatus (M. Smith, 1938)
- Muricopsis mariae (Finlay, 1930): synonym of Murexsul mariae Finlay, 1930
- Muricopsis mariangelaeRolán & F. Fernandes, 1991: synonym of Muricopsis rutila mariangelae Rolan & Fernandes, 1991
- Muricopsis mbotyiensis Houart, 1991: synonym of Murexsul mbotyiensis (Houart, 1991) (original combination)
- Muricopsis medicago (R. B. Watson, 1897) : synonym of Murexsul aradasii (Monterosato in Poirier, 1883)
- Muricopsis noduliferus (G. B. Sowerby II, 1841): synonym of Attiliosa nodulifera (G. B. Sowerby II, 1841)
- Muricopsis nothokieneri (E. H. Vokes, 1978): synonym of Murexsul nothokieneri E. H. Vokes, 1978
- Muricopsis octogonus (Quoy & Gaimard, 1833): synonym of Murexsul octogonus (Quoy & Gaimard, 1833)
- Muricopsis oliverai Kosuge, 1984: synonym of Paziella oliverai (Kosuge, 1984): synonym of Flexopteron oliverai (Kosuge, 1984) (original combination)
- Muricopsis orri Cernohorsky, 1976: synonym of Attiliosa orri (Cernohorsky, 1976) (original combination)
- Muricopsis ostrearum (Conrad, 1846): synonym of Calotrophon ostrearum (Conrad, 1846)
- Muricopsis oxossi Petuch, 1979: synonym of Pygmaepterys oxossi (Petuch, 1979) (original combination)
- Muricopsis oxytatus (M. Smith, 1938): synonym of Murexsul oxytatus (M. Smith, 1938)
- Muricopsis personatus Monterosato in Settepassi, 1977: synonym of Ocinebrina hispidula (Pallary, 1904): synonym of Ocenebra hispidula (Pallary, 1904) (unavailable following ICZN art. 11.4)
- Muricopsis poeyi Sarasúa & Espinosa, 1979: synonym of Attiliosa poeyi (Sarasúa & Espinosa, 1979) (original combination)
- Muricopsis profunda B. A. Marshall & K. W. Burch, 2000: synonym of Murexsul profundus (B. A. Marshall & K. W. Burch, 2000) (original combination)
- Muricopsis purpurispina Ponder, 1972: synonym of Murexsul purpurispinus (Ponder, 1972) (original combination)
- Muricopsis richardbinghami Petuch, 1987: synonym of Pygmaepterys richardbinghami (Petuch, 1987) (original combination)
- Muricopsis roseus (Reeve, 1846): synonym of Muricopsis rosea (Reeve, 1846) (wrong gender agreement of specific epithet)
- Muricopsis scotti B. A. Marshall & K. W. Burch, 2000: synonym of Rolandiella scotti (B. A. Marshall & K. W. Burch, 2000)
- Muricopsis skoglundae B. W. Myers, Hertz & D'Attilio, 1993: synonym of Murexsul skoglundae (B. W. Myers, Hertz & D'Attilio, 1993) (original combination)
- Muricopsis spiculus Houart, 1987: synonym of Murexsul spiculus (Houart, 1987) (original combination)
- Muricopsis spinulosa Stalio in Coen, 1933: synonym of Muricopsis blainvillii var. spinulosa Stalio in Coen, 1933: synonym of Muricopsis cristata (Brocchi, 1814)
- Muricopsis spinulosa (Costa O.G., 1861): synonym of Muricopsis aradasii (Poirier, 1883): synonym of Murexsul aradasii (Monterosato, 1883)
- Muricopsis sunderlandi Petuch, 1987: synonym of Murexsul sunderlandi (Petuch, 1987) (original combination)
- Muricopsis tenellus Monterosato in Settepassi, 1977: synonym of Ocinebrina hybrida (Aradas & Benoit, 1876): synonym of Ocenebra hybrida (Aradas & Benoit, 1876) (unavailable following ICZN art. 11.4)
- Muricopsis tokubeii (Nakamigawa & Habe, 1964): synonym of Murexsul tokubeii Nakamigawa & Habe, 1964
- Muricopsis tulensis Radwin & D'Attilio, 1976: synonym of Murexsul tulensis (Radwin & D'Attilio, 1976) (original combination)
- Muricopsis warreni Petuch, 1993: synonym of Murexsul warreni (Petuch, 1993) (original combination)
- Muricopsis zylmanae Petuch, 1993: synonym of Murexsul zylmanae (Petuch, 1993) (original combination)

The Indo-Pacific Molluscan database also mentions the following species with names in current use (those not mentioned here can be found in the genera Murexsul, Favartia and Rolandiella)

- Muricopsis ednae (M. Smith, 1940) : synonym of Murexsul interserratus (Sowerby, 1879)
- Muricopsis espinosus (Hutton, 1886) : synonym of Murexsul espinosus Hutton, 1886
  - Muricopsis espinosus mariae (Finlay, 1930) : synonym of Murexsul mariae Finlay, 1930
- Muricopsis oliverai Kosuge, 1984: synonym of Poirieria (Flexopteron) oliverai (Kosuge, 1984)
- Muricopsis oxytata (M. Smith, 1938) - hexagonal murex : synonym of Murexsul oxytatus (M. Smith, 1938)
- Muricopsis planilirata (Reeve, 1845): synonym of Murexsul planiliratus (Reeve, 1845)
