= Medicago (disambiguation) =

Medicago is a genus of flowering plants in the bean family Fabaceae.

Medicago may also refer to:

- Medicago Inc., a Canadian biotechnology company, currently developing a COVID-19 vaccine
- Alfalfa (Medicago sativa; cavalry clover) sometimes called just "medicago"

== See also ==
- Muricopsis medicago, a sea snail
