= Bellini (disambiguation) =

Bellini is an Italian surname. Bellini may also refer to:

- Bellini (cocktail)
- Bellini (German band), girl band produced by the Bellini Brothers of the Paffendorf project
- Bellini (Italian band), rock band
- Favartia bellini, marine gastropod mollusk in the family Muricidae
- Giardino Bellini, urban park of Catania
- Piazza Bellini, Naples, plaza located in central Naples, Italy
- Piazza Bellini, Palermo, in Palermo, Italy
- SS Bellini, Italian cargo ship in service 1925 to 1928
- Teatro Massimo Bellini, opera house in Catania, Sicily
- Teatro Bellini, Naples, opera house/theatre on Via Vicenzo Bellini in Central Naples
- Vellezzo Bellini, comune (municipality) in the Province of Pavia in the Italian region Lombardy

== See also ==
- Bellini and the Sphinx, a 2001 Brazilian film directed by Roberto Santucci
- Bellini and the Devil, a 2008 Brazilian film directed by Marcelo Galvão
