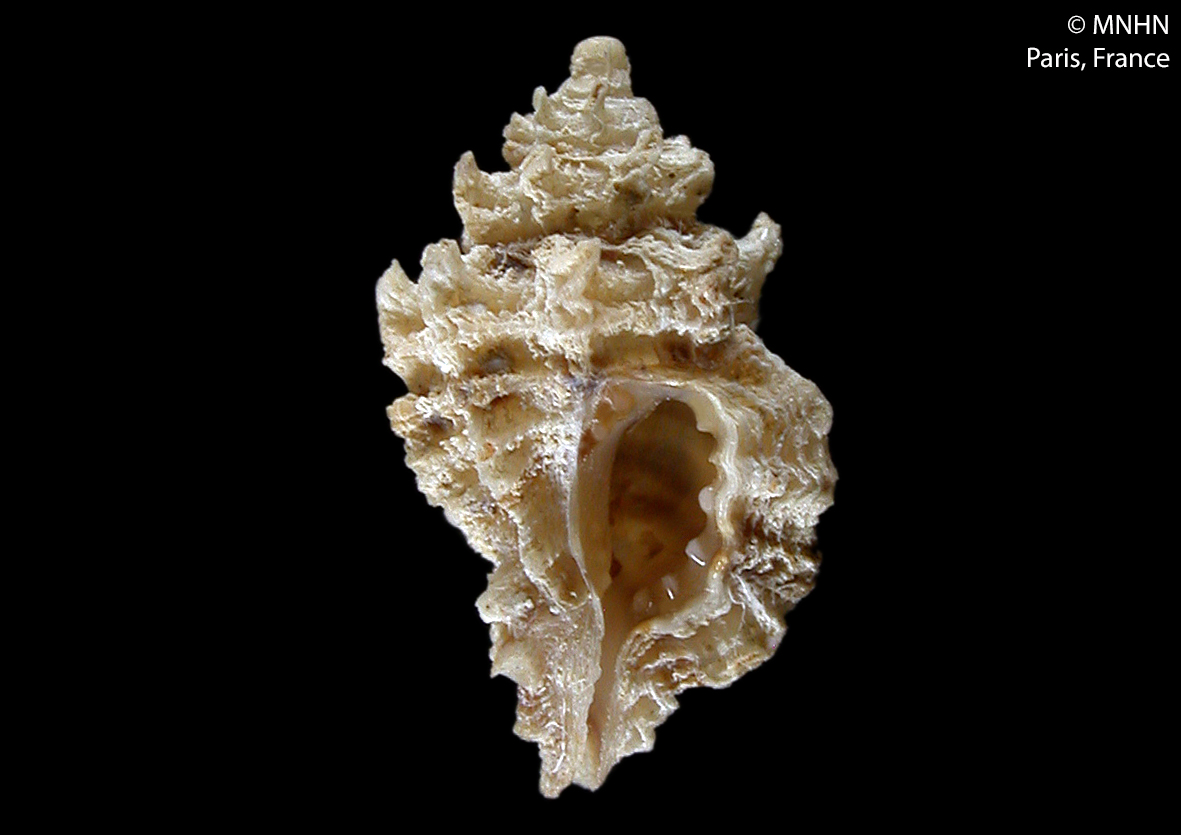
- Shell of Pygmaepterys germainae (specimen at MNHN, Paris)

Scientific classification
- Kingdom: Animalia
- Phylum: Mollusca
- Class: Gastropoda
- Subclass: Caenogastropoda
- Order: Neogastropoda
- Family: Muricidae
- Genus: Pygmaepterys
- Species: P. germainae

Binomial name
- Pygmaepterys germainae (Vokes & D'Attilio, 1980)

Synonyms
- Favartia (Murexiella) lafayettei Espinosa & Ortea, 2017; Favartia (Pygmaepterys) germainae (Vokes & D'Attilio, 1980); Favartia germainae (E. H. Vokes & D'Attilio, 1980); Favartia lafayettei Espinosa & Ortea, 2017

= Pygmaepterys germainae =

Species of gastropod

Pygmaepterys germainae is a species of sea snail, a marine gastropod mollusc in the family Muricidae, the murex snails or rock snails.

== Distribution ==
This marine species occurs off Puerto Rico and Martinique.
