= Pygmaepterys alfredensis =

Scientific classification
- Kingdom: Animalia
- Phylum: Mollusca
- Class: Gastropoda
- Subclass: Caenogastropoda
- Order: Neogastropoda
- Family: Muricidae
- Genus: Pygmaepterys
- Species: P. alfredensis

Binomial name
- Pygmaepterys alfredensis (Bartsch, 1915)

Synonyms
- Favartia (Pygmaepterys) alfredensis (Bartsch, 1915); Favartia alfredensis (Bartsch, 1915); Murex alfredensis Bartsch, 1915

Species of gastropod

Pygmaepterys alfredensis is a species of sea snail, a marine gastropod mollusc in the family Muricidae, the murex snails or rock snails.

== Distribution ==
This marine species occurs off Port Alfred, South Africa
