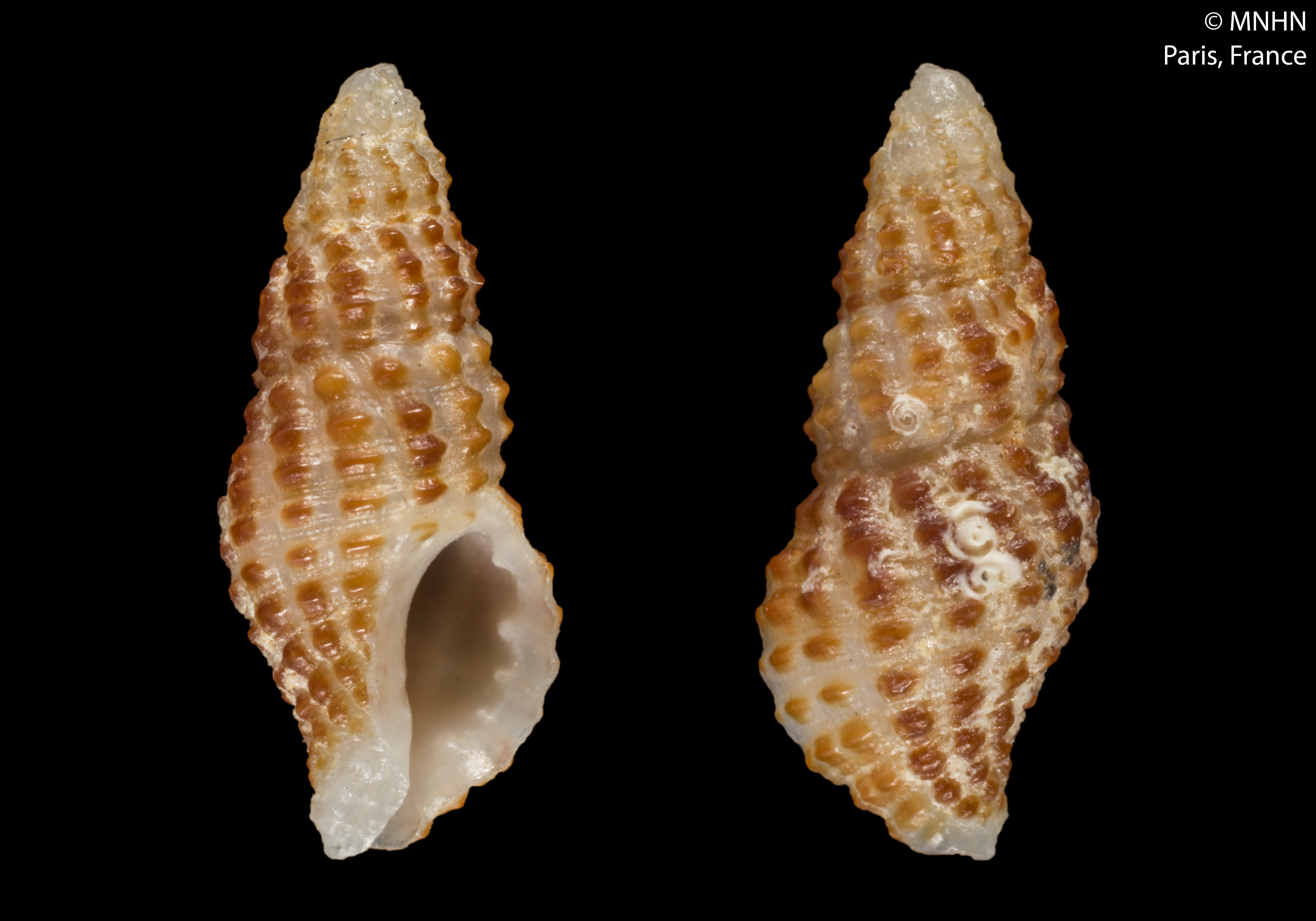
- Shell of Muricopsis suga (Paralectotype at MNHN, Paris)

Scientific classification
- Kingdom: Animalia
- Phylum: Mollusca
- Class: Gastropoda
- Subclass: Caenogastropoda
- Order: Neogastropoda
- Family: Muricidae
- Genus: Muricopsis
- Species: M. suga

Binomial name
- Muricopsis suga (Fischer Piette, 1942)

Synonyms
- Muricopsis (Muricopsis) suga (Fischer-Piette, 1942)· accepted, alternate representation; Muricopsis (Risomurex) suga (Fischer-Piette, 1942); Tritonalia (Ocinebrina) suga Fischer-Piette, 1942; Tritonalia suga Fischer-Piette, 1942 (original combination)

= Muricopsis suga =

Species of gastropod

Muricopsis suga is a species of sea snail, a marine gastropod mollusk in the family Muricidae, the murex snails or rock snails.

Subspecies

- Muricopsis suga discissus Houart, 1990
- Muricopsis suga suga (Fischer-Piette, 1942)

== Distribution ==
This marine species occurs off Senegal.
