= Muricopsis perexigua =

Scientific classification
- Kingdom: Animalia
- Phylum: Mollusca
- Class: Gastropoda
- Subclass: Caenogastropoda
- Order: Neogastropoda
- Family: Muricidae
- Genus: Muricopsis
- Species: M. perexigua

Binomial name
- Muricopsis perexigua (Vokes, 1994)

Synonyms
- Muricopsis perexigua Vokes, 1994

Species of gastropod

Muricopsis (Muricopsis) perexigua is a species of sea snail, a marine gastropod mollusk in the family Muricidae, the murex snails or rock snails.

== Description ==
The shell attains a length of 7 mm.

== Distribution ==
This species is distributed in the Caribbean Sea along Belize and Honduras; in the Atlantic Ocean along the Bahamas.
