= Pygmaepterys yemenensis =

Scientific classification
- Kingdom: Animalia
- Phylum: Mollusca
- Class: Gastropoda
- Subclass: Caenogastropoda
- Order: Neogastropoda
- Family: Muricidae
- Genus: Pygmaepterys
- Species: P. yemenensis

Binomial name
- Pygmaepterys yemenensis (Houart & Wranik, 1989)

Synonyms
- Favartia (Pygmaepterys) yemenensis (Houart & Wranik, 1989); Favartia yemenensis (Houart & Wranik, 1989)

Species of gastropod

Pygmaepterys yemenensis is a species of sea snail, a marine gastropod mollusc in the family Muricidae, the murex snails or rock snails.

== Distribution ==
This marine species occurs in the Gulf of Aden.
