= Pygmaepterys maraisi =

Scientific classification
- Kingdom: Animalia
- Phylum: Mollusca
- Class: Gastropoda
- Subclass: Caenogastropoda
- Order: Neogastropoda
- Family: Muricidae
- Genus: Pygmaepterys
- Species: P. maraisi

Binomial name
- Pygmaepterys maraisi (Vokes, 1978)

Synonyms
- Favartia (Pygmaepterys) maraisi (E. H. Vokes, 1978); Favartia maraisi (E. H. Vokes, 1978); Pterynotus (Pygmaepterys) maraisi Vokes, 1978

Species of gastropod

Pygmaepterys maraisi is a species of sea snail, a marine gastropod mollusc in the family Muricidae, the murex snails or rock snails.

== Distribution ==
This marine species occurs off Natal, South Africa.
