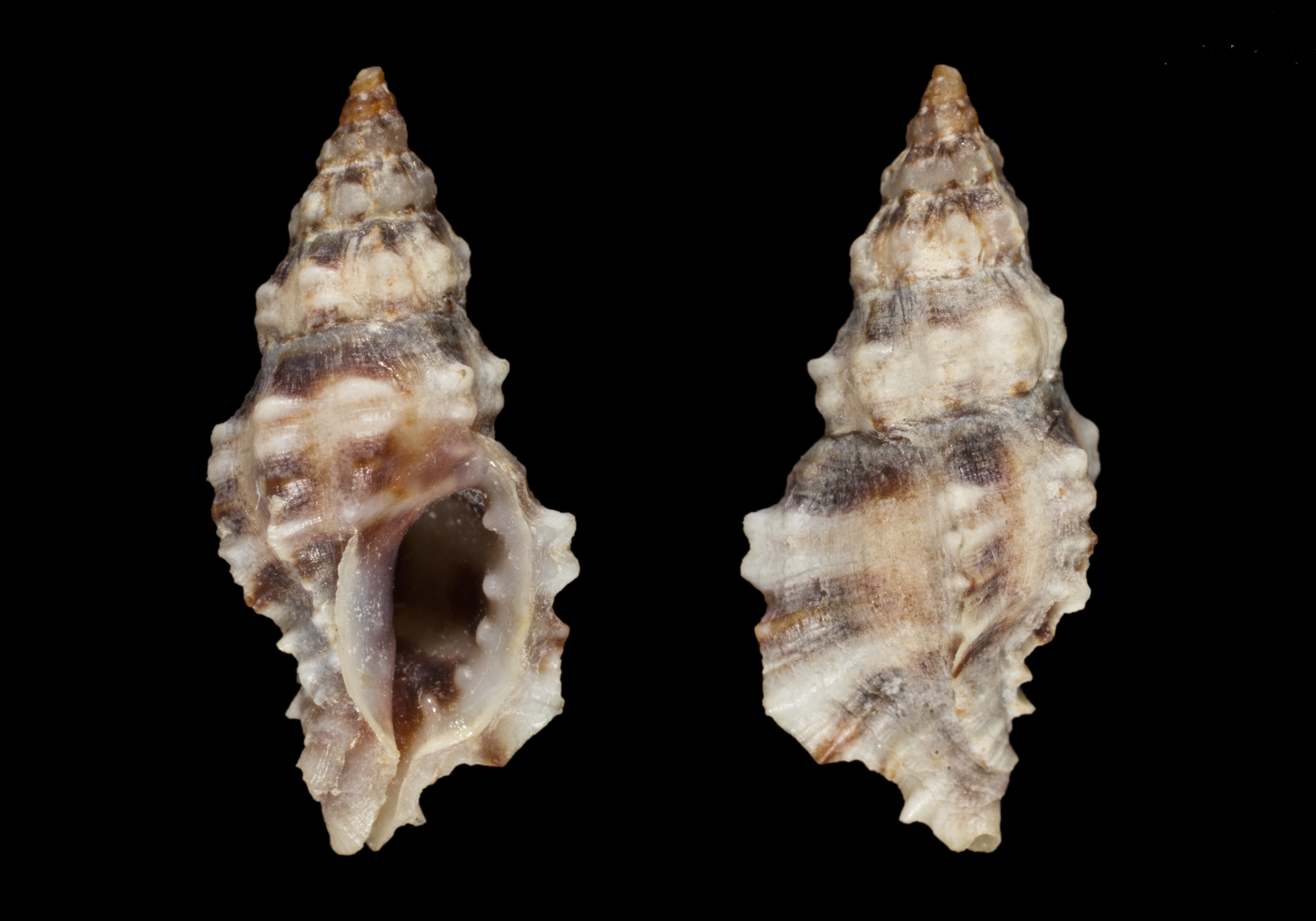
- Shells of Muricopsis delemarrei (holotype in the MNHN, Paris)

Scientific classification
- Kingdom: Animalia
- Phylum: Mollusca
- Class: Gastropoda
- Subclass: Caenogastropoda
- Order: Neogastropoda
- Family: Muricidae
- Genus: Muricopsis
- Species: M. delemarrei

Binomial name
- Muricopsis delemarrei Houart, 2005

= Muricopsis delemarrei =

Species of gastropod

Muricopsis delemarrei is a species of sea snail, a marine gastropod mollusk in the family Muricidae, the murex snails or rock snails.

== Distribution ==
The species is endemic to São Tomé e Príncipe.
