= Muricopsis pauxilla =

Scientific classification
- Kingdom: Animalia
- Phylum: Mollusca
- Class: Gastropoda
- Subclass: Caenogastropoda
- Order: Neogastropoda
- Family: Muricidae
- Genus: Muricopsis
- Species: M. pauxilla

Binomial name
- Muricopsis pauxilla (A. Adams, 1854)

Synonyms
- Murex pauxillus A. Adams, 1854

Species of gastropod

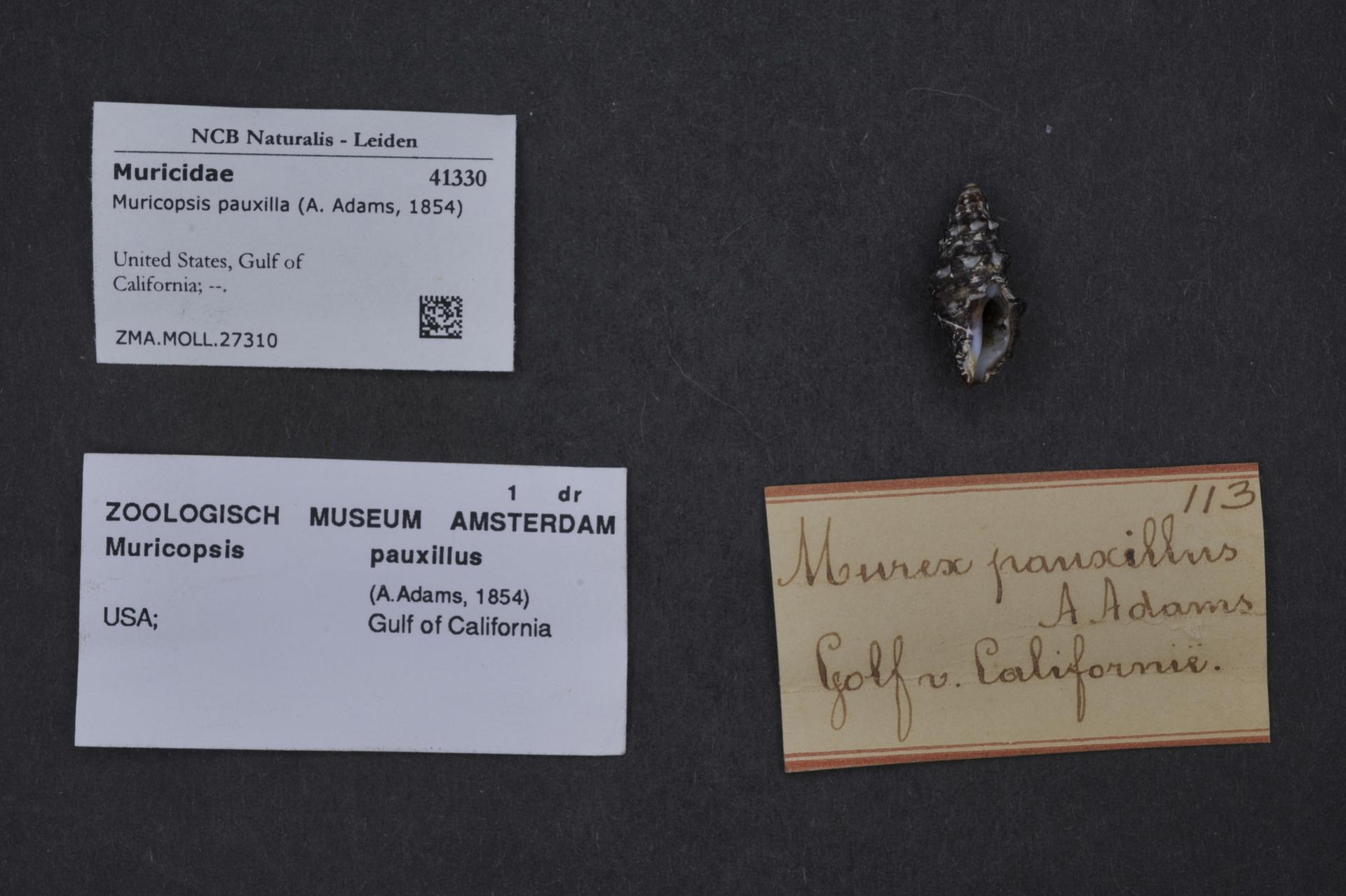
Muricopsis pauxilla (A. Adams, 1854)

Muricopsis (Muricopsis) pauxilla is a species of sea snail, a marine gastropod mollusk in the family Muricidae, the murex snails or rock snails.

== Description ==
The size of an adult shell varies between 9 mm and 18 mm.

== Distribution ==
This marine species is distributed in the Gulf of California, along Western Mexico.
