= Pygmaepterys cracentis =

Scientific classification
- Kingdom: Animalia
- Phylum: Mollusca
- Class: Gastropoda
- Subclass: Caenogastropoda
- Order: Neogastropoda
- Family: Muricidae
- Genus: Pygmaepterys
- Species: P. cracentis

Binomial name
- Pygmaepterys cracentis (Houart, 1996)

Synonyms
- Favartia (Pygmaepterys) cracentis (Houart, 1996); Favartia cracentis (Houart, 1996)

Species of gastropod

Pygmaepterys cracentis is a species of sea snail, a marine gastropod mollusc in the family Muricidae, the murex snails or rock snails.

== Distribution ==
This marine species occurs off the Moluccas, Indonesia.
