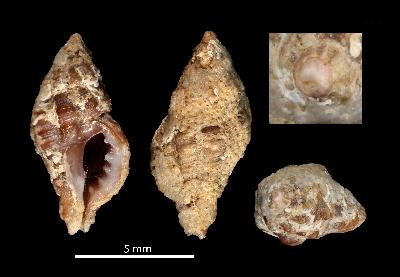
- Shell of Muricopsis matildeae (paratype at MNHN, Paris)

Conservation status
- Data Deficient (IUCN 2.3)

Scientific classification
- Kingdom: Animalia
- Phylum: Mollusca
- Class: Gastropoda
- Subclass: Caenogastropoda
- Order: Neogastropoda
- Family: Muricidae
- Genus: Muricopsis
- Species: M. matildeae

Binomial name
- Muricopsis matildeae Rolan & Fernandes, 1991

Synonyms
- Muricopsis (Muricopsis) matildeae Rolán & F. Fernandes, 1991· accepted, alternate representation; Muricopsis (Risomurex) matildeae Rolán & F. Fernandes, 1991 (basionym)

= Muricopsis matildeae =

Species of gastropod

Muricopsis matildeae is a species of small sea snail, a marine gastropod mollusk in the family Muricidae, the rock snails.

This species is endemic to São Tomé and Príncipe.
