= Muricopsis gilbertharrisi =

Scientific classification
- Kingdom: Animalia
- Phylum: Mollusca
- Class: Gastropoda
- Subclass: Caenogastropoda
- Order: Neogastropoda
- Family: Muricidae
- Genus: Muricopsis
- Species: M. gilbertharrisi

Binomial name
- Muricopsis gilbertharrisi (Weisbord, 1962)

Synonyms
- Drupa (Morula) gilbertharrisi Weisbord, 1962

Species of gastropod

Muricopsis (Muricopsis) gilbertharrisi is a species of sea snail, a marine gastropod mollusk in the family Muricidae, the murex snails or rock snails.
