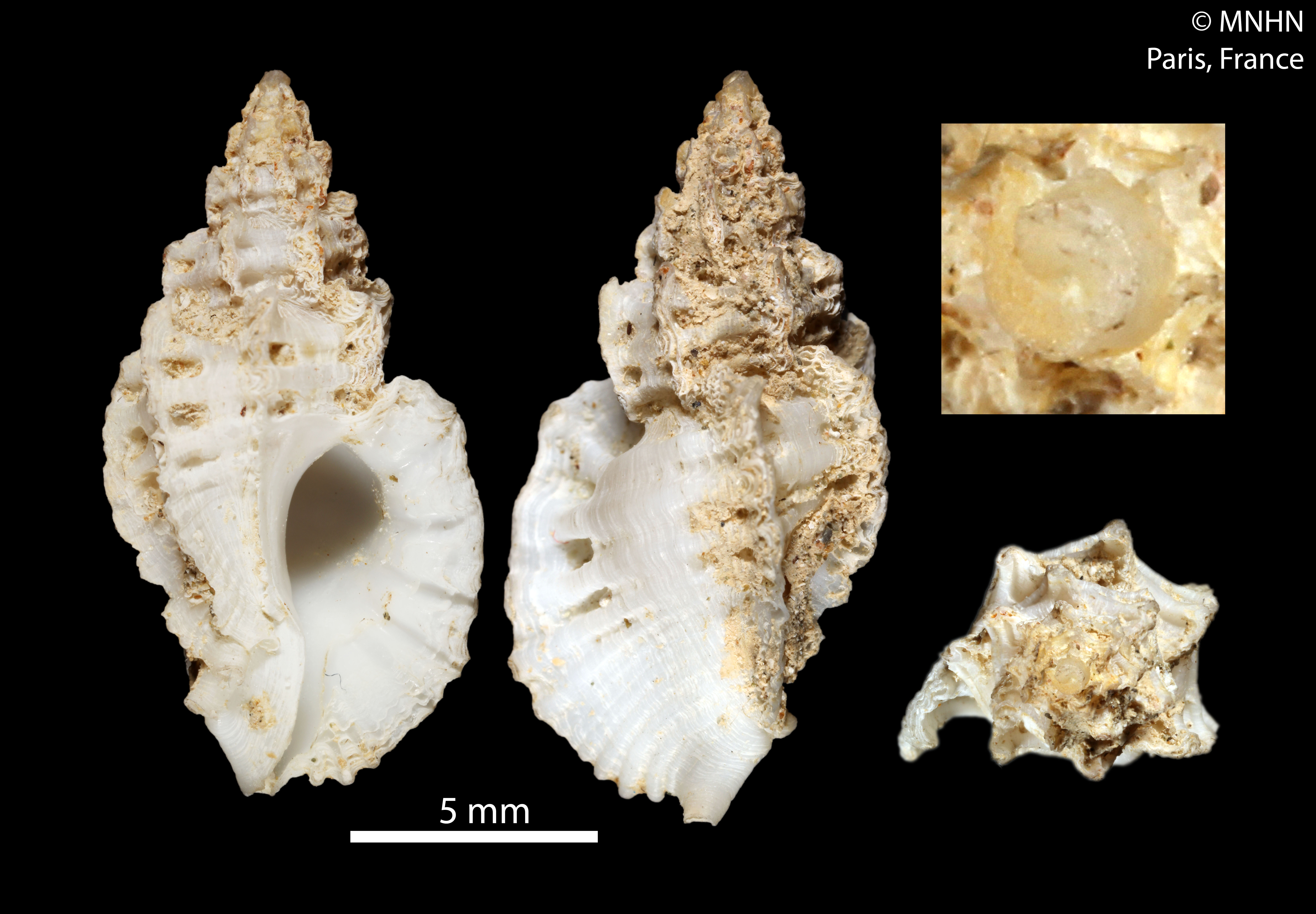
- Shell of Pygmaepterys paulboschi (paratype at MNHN, Paris)

Scientific classification
- Kingdom: Animalia
- Phylum: Mollusca
- Class: Gastropoda
- Subclass: Caenogastropoda
- Order: Neogastropoda
- Family: Muricidae
- Genus: Pygmaepterys
- Species: P. paulboschi

Binomial name
- Pygmaepterys paulboschi (Smythe & Houart, 1984)

Synonyms
- Favartia (Pygmaepterys) paulboschi Smythe & Houart, 1984; Favartia paulboschi Smythe & Houart, 1984

= Pygmaepterys paulboschi =

Species of gastropod

Pygmaepterys paulboschi is a species of sea snail, a marine gastropod mollusc in the family Muricidae, the murex snails or rock snails.

== Distribution ==
This marine species occurs in the Gulf of Oman.
