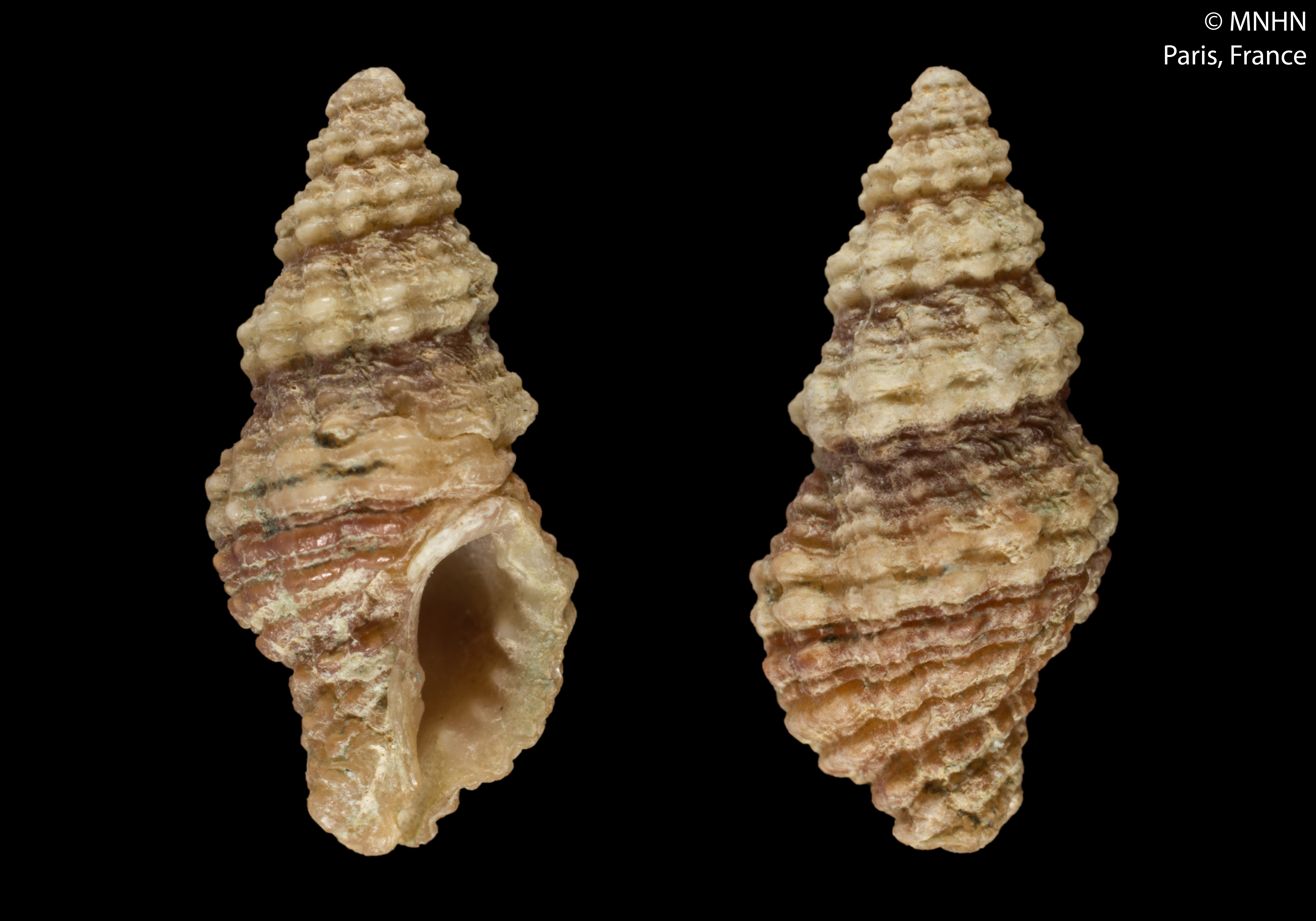
- Shell of Muricopsis seminolensis (paratype at MNHN, Paris)

Scientific classification
- Kingdom: Animalia
- Phylum: Mollusca
- Class: Gastropoda
- Subclass: Caenogastropoda
- Order: Neogastropoda
- Family: Muricidae
- Genus: Muricopsis
- Species: M. seminolensis

Binomial name
- Muricopsis seminolensis Vokes & Houart, 1986

Synonyms
- Muricopsis (Muricopsis) seminolensis E. H. Vokes & Houart, 1986· unaccepted, alternate representation; Muricopsis (Risomurex) seminolensis Vokes & Houart, 1986

= Muricopsis seminolensis =

Species of gastropod

Muricopsis seminolensis is a species of sea snail, a marine gastropod mollusk in the family Muricidae; the murex snails or rock snails.

== Distribution ==
This marine species occurs at a depth of 38 meters off Senegal.
