= Muricopsis marcusi =

Scientific classification
- Kingdom: Animalia
- Phylum: Mollusca
- Class: Gastropoda
- Subclass: Caenogastropoda
- Order: Neogastropoda
- Family: Muricidae
- Genus: Muricopsis
- Species: M. marcusi

Binomial name
- Muricopsis marcusi Vokes, 1994

Synonyms
- Muricopsis marcusi Vokes, 1994

Species of gastropod

Muricopsis (Muricopsis) marcusi is a species of sea snail, a marine gastropod mollusk in the family Muricidae, the murex snails or rock snails.
