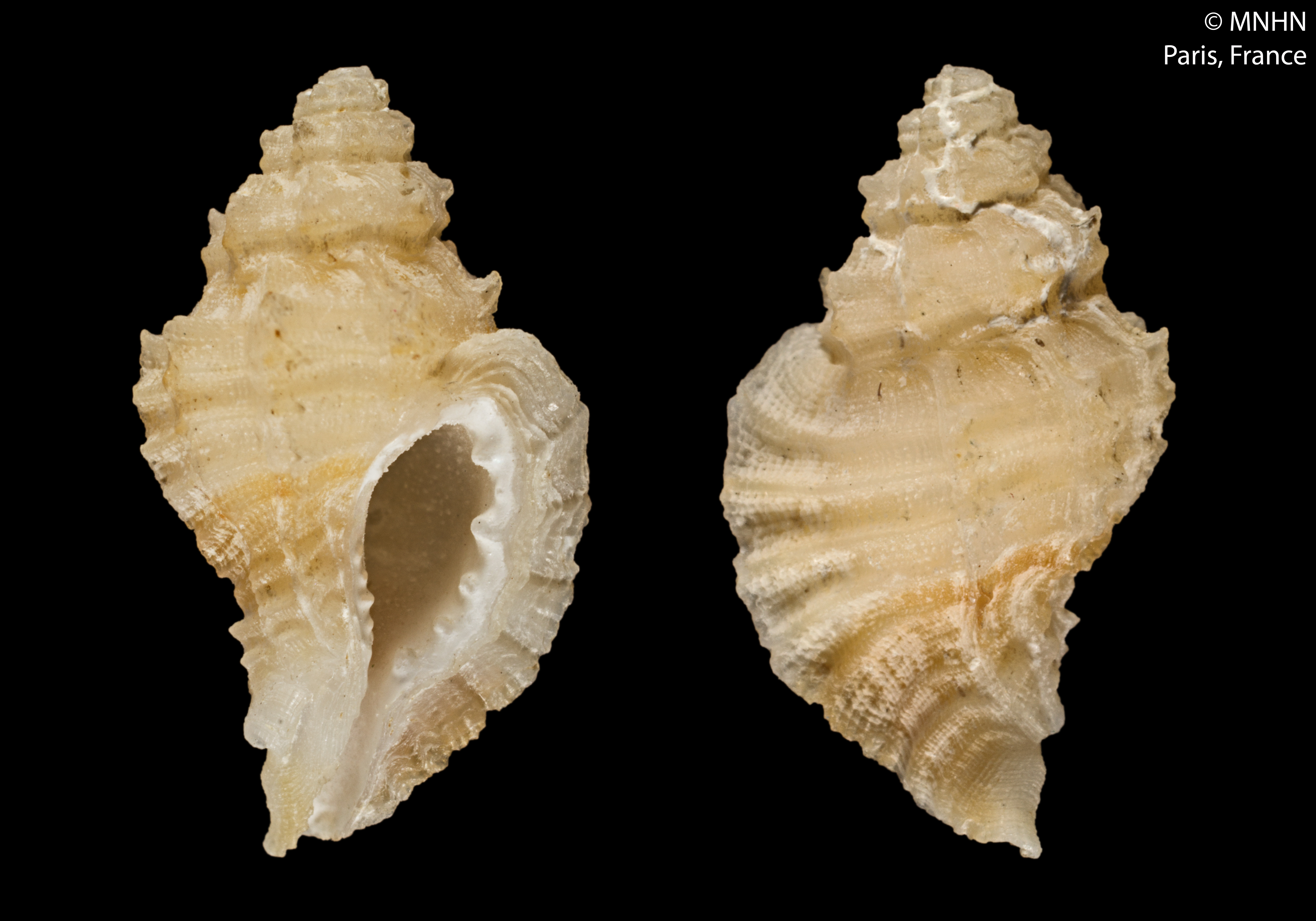
- Shell of Pygmaepterys avatea (holotype at MNHN, Paris)

Scientific classification
- Kingdom: Animalia
- Phylum: Mollusca
- Class: Gastropoda
- Subclass: Caenogastropoda
- Order: Neogastropoda
- Family: Muricidae
- Genus: Pygmaepterys
- Species: P. avatea

Binomial name
- Pygmaepterys avatea Houart & Tröndlé, 2008

Synonyms
- Favartia (Pygmaepterys) avatea Houart & Tröndlé, 2008 (basionym); Favartia avatea Houart & Tröndlé, 2008 (original combination)

= Pygmaepterys avatea =

Species of gastropod

Pygmaepterys avatea is a species of sea snail, a marine gastropod mollusc in the family Muricidae, the murex snails or rock snails.

== Distribution ==
This marine species occurs off the Austral Islands, French Polynesia.
