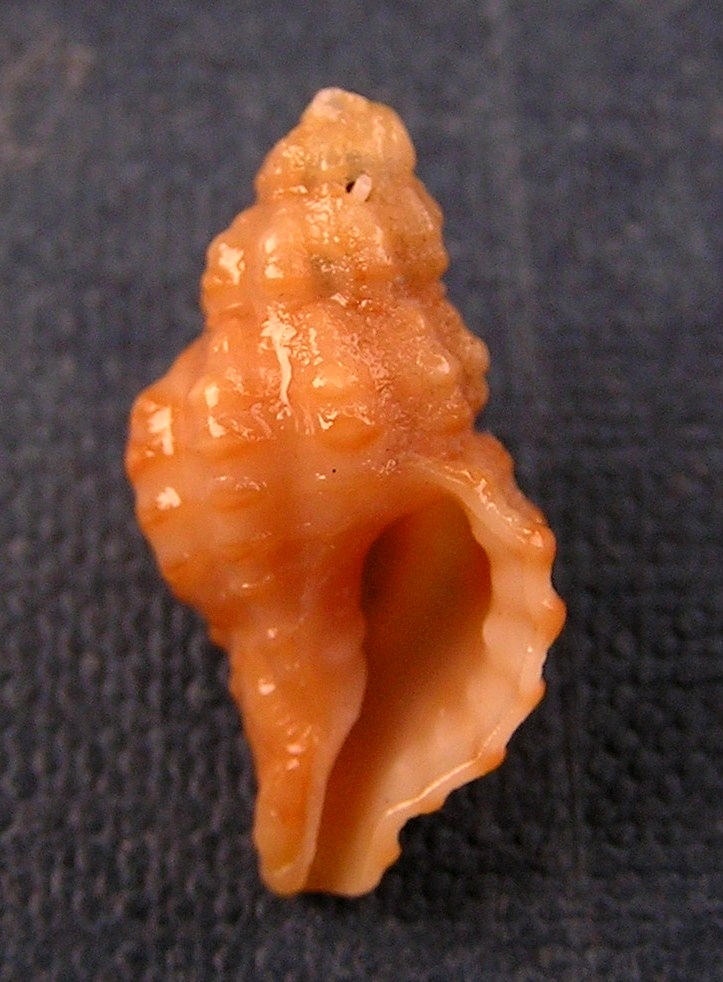
- Muricopsis (Muricopsis) necocheana

Scientific classification
- Kingdom: Animalia
- Phylum: Mollusca
- Class: Gastropoda
- Subclass: Caenogastropoda
- Order: Neogastropoda
- Family: Muricidae
- Genus: Muricopsis
- Species: M. necocheana

Binomial name
- Muricopsis necocheana (Pilsbry, 1900)

Synonyms
- Sistrum nicocheanum Pilsbry, 1900

= Muricopsis necocheana =

Species of gastropod

Muricopsis necocheana is a species of sea snail, a marine gastropod mollusk in the family Muricidae, the murex snails or rock snails. This species was described by the American biologist Henry Augustus Pilsbry, with the name Sistrum nicocheanum in a scientific article included in the number 1 of volume XIV of the journal The Nautilus, published in May 1900.

== Description ==
The shell of this species was originally described as follows: shell imperforate or rimate, fusiform, thick and strong, brownish-orange color, the whorl is brownish-brown. Ornamentation consists of strong longitudinal waves, rounded, equal to their intervals, 8 or 7 in number in the last whorl; these waves are traversed by quite strong spiral chords, which widen into transversely oblong low tubercles above the tops of the waves. Between these cords there are several spiral threads in most or all intervals. Whorls are convex, the last with concave contours below, produced, in a fairly long anterior canal. Aperture oval, brownish-orange inside; thick or beveled peristome, armed with six subequal teeth inside; angular columellar margin at origin of anterior canal, with a small transverse fold above angle; fairly straight and long channel for this genus. Length 21.5 mm, diameter 11 mm, length of aperture and canal 12 mm.

== Distribution ==
This species is distributed in the Southwest Atlantic along Southeast Brazil and Argentina.
