= Muricopsis caribbaea =

Scientific classification
- Kingdom: Animalia
- Phylum: Mollusca
- Class: Gastropoda
- Subclass: Caenogastropoda
- Order: Neogastropoda
- Family: Muricidae
- Genus: Muricopsis
- Species: M. caribbaea

Binomial name
- Muricopsis caribbaea (Bartsch & Rehder, 1939)

Synonyms
- Fusus muricoides C.B. Adams, 1845; Risomurex caribbaeus (Bartsch & Rehder, 1939); Tritonalia (Ocinebrina) caribbaea Bartsch & Rehder, 1939 (basionym)

Species of gastropod

Muricopsis (Muricopsis) caribbaea is a species of sea snail, a marine gastropod mollusk in the family Muricidae, the murex snails or rock snails.

== Description ==
The shell attains a length of 15 mm.

== Distribution ==
This species is distributed in the Gulf of Mexico along Florida, in the Caribbean Sea along Mexico and Venezuela; in the Lesser Antilles.
