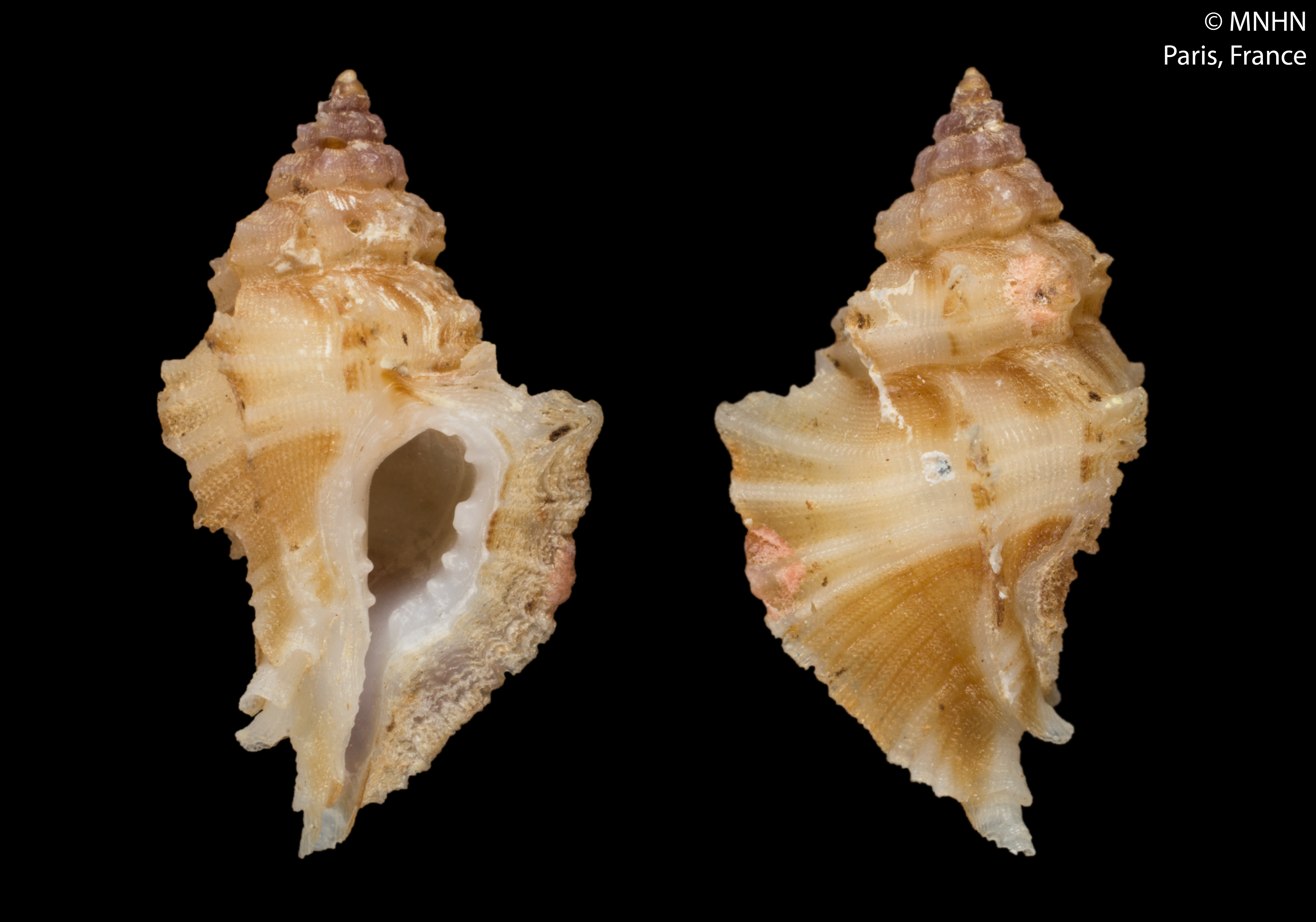
- Shell of Pygmaepterys philcloveri (holotype at MNHN, Paris)

Scientific classification
- Kingdom: Animalia
- Phylum: Mollusca
- Class: Gastropoda
- Subclass: Caenogastropoda
- Order: Neogastropoda
- Family: Muricidae
- Genus: Pygmaepterys
- Species: P. philcloveri

Binomial name
- Pygmaepterys philcloveri (Houart, 1984)

Synonyms
- Favartia (Pygmaepterys) philcloveri (Houart, 1984); Favartia philcloveri (Houart, 1984); Poirieria (Pazinotus) philcloveri Houart, 1984

= Pygmaepterys philcloveri =

Species of gastropod

Pygmaepterys philcloveri is a species of sea snail, a marine gastropod mollusc in the family Muricidae, the murex snails or rock snails.

== Distribution ==
This marine species occurs off Mindanao, the Philippines.
