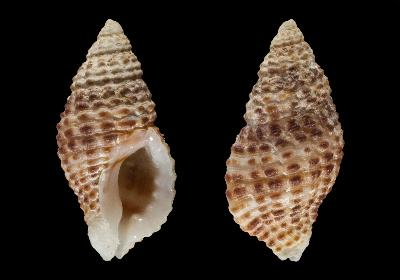
- Shell of Muricopsis fusiformis punctata (paratype in the MNHN, Paris)

Scientific classification
- Kingdom: Animalia
- Phylum: Mollusca
- Class: Gastropoda
- Subclass: Caenogastropoda
- Order: Neogastropoda
- Family: Muricidae
- Genus: Muricopsis
- Species: M. fusiformis

Binomial name
- Muricopsis fusiformis (Gmelin, 1791)

Synonyms
- Cantharus (Pollia) multigranosus Maltzan, 1884 (junior synonym); Cantharus multigranosus Maltzan, 1884; Murex fusiformis Gmelin, 1791 (original combination); Muricopsis (Muricopsis) fusiformis (Gmelin, 1791)· accepted, alternate representation; Muricopsis (Muricopsis) fusiformis fusiformis (Gmelin, 1791)· accepted, alternate representation; Muricopsis (Risomurex) fusiformis (Gmelin, 1791); Muricopsis fusiformis fusiformis (Gmelin, 1791)· accepted, alternate representation

= Muricopsis fusiformis =

Species of gastropod

Muricopsis fusiformis is a species of sea snail, a marine gastropod mollusk in the family Muricidae, the murex snails or rock snails.

Subspecies

- Muricopsis fusiformis punctata Houart, 1990

== Distribution ==
This marine species occurs off Senegal
