= Muricopsis zeteki =

Scientific classification
- Kingdom: Animalia
- Phylum: Mollusca
- Class: Gastropoda
- Subclass: Caenogastropoda
- Order: Neogastropoda
- Family: Muricidae
- Genus: Muricopsis
- Species: M. zeteki

Binomial name
- Muricopsis zeteki Hertlein & Strong, 1951

Synonyms
- Murex aculeatus Wood, 1828 (invalid: junior homonym of Murex aculeatus Lamarck, 1822; Murex dubius is a replacement name); Murex dubius G.B. Sowerby II, 1841 (invalid: junior homonym of Murex dubius Dillwyn, 1817; Muricopsis zeteki is a replacement name); Murexsul zeteki (Hertlein & Strong, 1951); Muricidea dubius (G. B. Sowerby II, 1841)

Species of gastropod

Muricopsis zeteki is a species of sea snail, a marine gastropod mollusk in the family Muricidae, the murex snails or rock snails.
