= Pygmaepterys funafutiensis =

Scientific classification
- Kingdom: Animalia
- Phylum: Mollusca
- Class: Gastropoda
- Subclass: Caenogastropoda
- Order: Neogastropoda
- Family: Muricidae
- Genus: Pygmaepterys
- Species: P. funafutiensis

Binomial name
- Pygmaepterys funafutiensis (Hedley, 1899)

Synonyms
- Favartia (Pygmaepterys) funafutiensis (Hedley, 1899); Favartia funafutiensis (Hedley, 1899); Murex funafutiensis Hedley, 1899

Species of gastropod

Pygmaepterys funafutiensis is a species of sea snail, a marine gastropod mollusc in the family Muricidae, the murex snails or rock snails.

== Distribution ==
This marine species occurs off Tuvalu.
