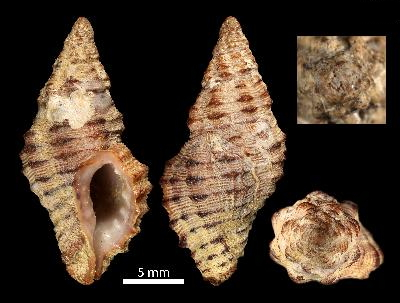
- Shells of Muricopsis omanensis (paratype in MNHN, Paris)

Scientific classification
- Kingdom: Animalia
- Phylum: Mollusca
- Class: Gastropoda
- Subclass: Caenogastropoda
- Order: Neogastropoda
- Family: Muricidae
- Genus: Muricopsis
- Species: M. omanensis

Binomial name
- Muricopsis omanensis Smythe & Oliver, 1986

Synonyms
- Muricopsis omanensis Smythe & Oliver, 1986

= Muricopsis omanensis =

Species of gastropod

Muricopsis (Muricopsis) omanensis is a species of sea snail, a marine gastropod mollusk in the family Muricidae, the murex snails or rock snails.

== Distribution ==
This marine species occurs off Oman.
