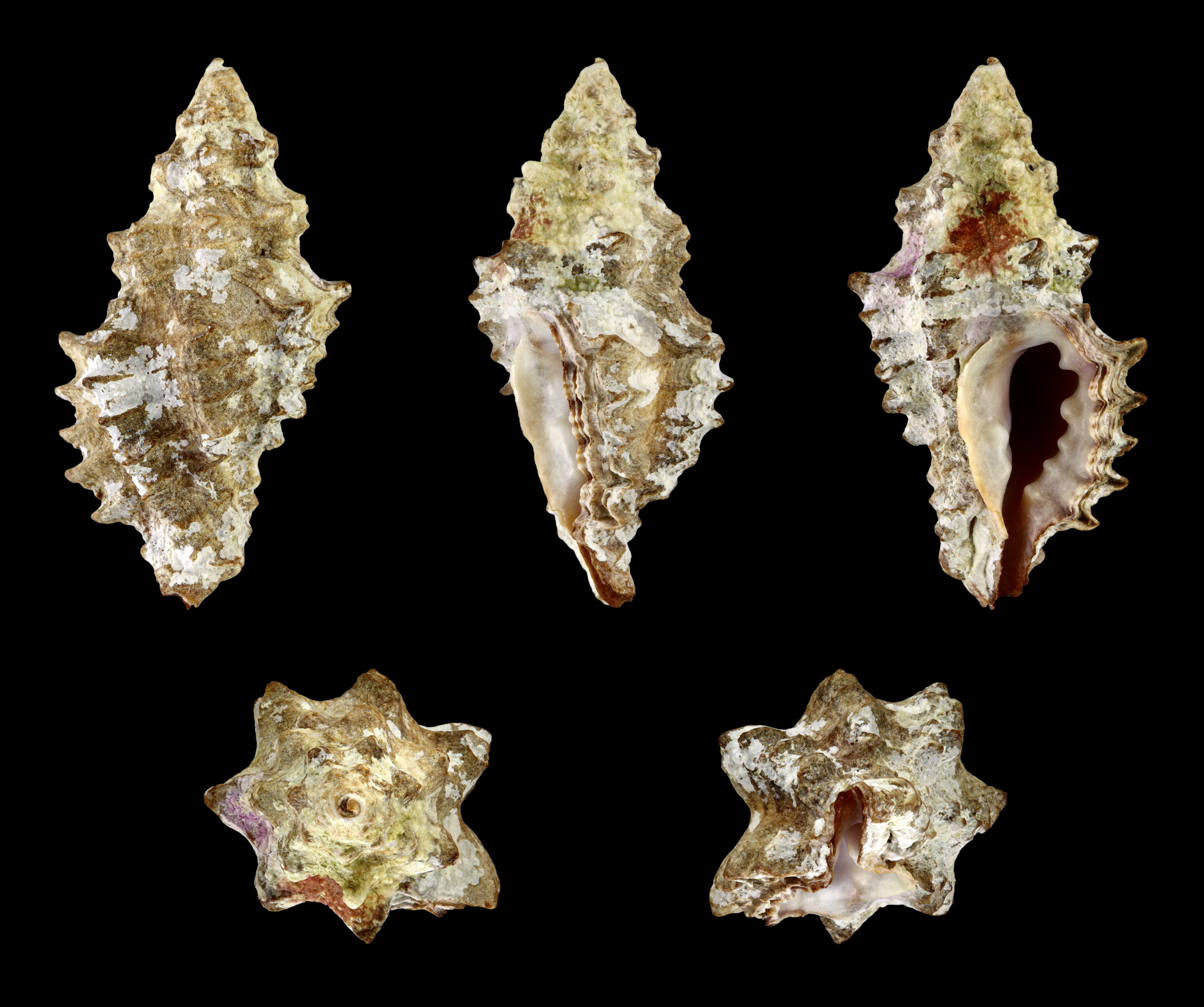
- A shell of Muricopsis (Muricopsis) cristata

Scientific classification
- Kingdom: Animalia
- Phylum: Mollusca
- Class: Gastropoda
- Subclass: Caenogastropoda
- Order: Neogastropoda
- Family: Muricidae
- Genus: Muricopsis
- Species: M. cristata

Binomial name
- Muricopsis cristata (Brocchi, 1814)

= Muricopsis cristata =

Muricopsis cristata Temporal range: Pliocene - Recent

Species of gastropod

Muricopsis (Muricopsis) cristata, common name Blainville's muricop, is a species of sea snail, a marine gastropod mollusk in the family Muricidae, the murex snails or rock snails.

== Synonyms ==
- Fusus asperrimus Millet, 1865 (junior homonym of Fusus asperrimus T. Brown, 1827)
- Fusus dodecanesinus Bevilacqua, 1928
- Murex blainvillei Payraudeau, 1826
- Murex blainvillei var. aterrima Dautzenberg, 1890
- Murex blainvillei var. bicolor Monterosato, 1878
- Murex blainvillei var. gracilis Monterosato in Bucquoy, Dautzenberg & Dollfus, 1882
- Murex blainvillei var. gracilis Monterosato, 1870
- Murex blainvillei var. minor Praus, 1906
- Murex blainvillei var. rosea Monterosato, 1878 in Bucquoy, Dautzenberg & Dollfus, 1882
- Murex blainvillei var. trophoniformis Monterosato, 1884
- Murex blainvillei var. violacea Monterosato, in Bucquoy, Dautzenberg & Dollfus, 1882
- Murex blainvillii Payraudeau, 1826
- Murex blainvillii var. bicolor Monterosato, 1878
- Murex cataphractus Sowerby, 1834
- Murex cinosurus Chiereghini in Nardo, 1847
- Murex cristatus Brocchi, 1814 (basionym)
- Murex cristatus var. adellus de Gregorio, 1885
- Murex cristatus var. ampa de Gregorio, 1885
- Murex cristatus var. ampus de Gregorio, 1885
- Murex cristatus var. berdica de Gregorio, 1885 (synonym)
- Murex cristatus var. berdicus de Gregorio, 1885
- Murex cristatus var. emus de Gregorio, 1885
- Murex cristatus var. expallescens Tapparone Canefri, 1869
- Murex cristatus var. inermis Philippi, 1836
- Murex dentatus Anton, 1838
- Murex inermis Philippi, 1836
- Murex inermis trifasciata Nordsieck, 1972
- Murex pliciferus Bivona-Bernardi, 1832
- Murex porrectus Locard, 1886
- Murex pustulatus Locard, 1899
- Murex rudis Risso, 1826
- Murex rugulosa O.G. Costa, 1861
- Murex subspinosus A. Adams, 1854
- Muricidea blainvillei [sic] (misspelling of Muricidea blainvillii (Payraudeau, 1826))
- Muricidea blainvillei var. trophoniformis Weinkauff, 1868)
- Muricidea polliaeformis Weinkauff, 1868
- Muricopsis (Muricopsis) cristata (Brocchi, 1814)· accepted, alternate representation
- Muricopsis atra Nordsieck, 1972
- Muricopsis blainvillei (Payraudeau, 1826)
- Muricopsis blainvillei var. hispida Coen, 1933
- Muricopsis blainvillei var. horrida Monterosato in Coen, 1933
- Muricopsis blainvillei var. oblonga Stalio in Coen, 1933
- Muricopsis blainvillei var. rosea Bucquoy, Dautzenberg & Dollfus, 1882
- Muricopsis blainvillei var. spinulata Coen, 1937
- Muricopsis blainvillei var. spinulosa Coen, 1933
- Muricopsis blainvillei var. spinulosa Stalio in Coen, 1933
- Muricopsis blainvillei var. umbilicata Coen, 1930
- Muricopsis blainvillei var. violacea Bucquoy, Dautzenberg & Dollfus, 1882
- Muricopsis blainvillii (Payraudeau, 1826)
- Muricopsis blainvillii var. horrida Monterosato in Coen, 1933
- Muricopsis blainvillii var. oblonga Stalio in Coen, 1933
- Muricopsis blainvillii var. spinulosa Stalio in Coen, 1933
- Muricopsis cristatus (Brocchi, 1814)
- Muricopsis cristatus major Settepassi, 1977
- Muricopsis cristatus pungens Monterosato in Settepassi, 1977
- Muricopsis cristatus spinulatus Stalio in Settepassi, 1977
- Muricopsis glutinosa Palazzi & Villari, 2001 (dubious synonym)
- Muricopsis hispida Monterosato in Coen, 1933
- Muricopsis inermis (Philippi, 1836)
- Muricopsis inermis trifasciata Nordsieck, 1972
- Muricopsis spinulosa Stalio in Coen, 1933
- Muricopsis spinulosa obsoleta Nordsieck, 1972
- Ocinebra blainvillei [sic] (misspelling of Ocinebra blainvillii (Payraudeau, 1826))
- Ocinebra blainvillei var. elongata Locard & Caziot, 1900
- Ocinebra blainvillei var. ventricosa Locard & Caziot, 1900
- Ocinebrina blainvillei (Payraudeau, 1826)
- Ocinebrina blainvillei var. hirsuta Pallary, 1904
- Ocinebrina blainvillii (Payraudeau, 1826)
- Pollia coccinea Monterosato, 1884 (dubious synonym)

== Fossil records ==
The fossil record dates back to the Pliocene (age range: from 3.6 to 2.588 million years ago).

== Description ==
The shell size varies between 10 mm and 35 mm. Size, color and morphology are very variable. The whorls have a variable number of more or less prominent varices showing foliaceous or spinose projections. They have a well-developed siphonal canal, and the siphon is quite elongated.

== Distribution ==
This quite common species ioccurs in the Mediterranean Sea, in the Atlantic Ocean off Portugal, Morocco and the Canaries and in the Red Sea.
