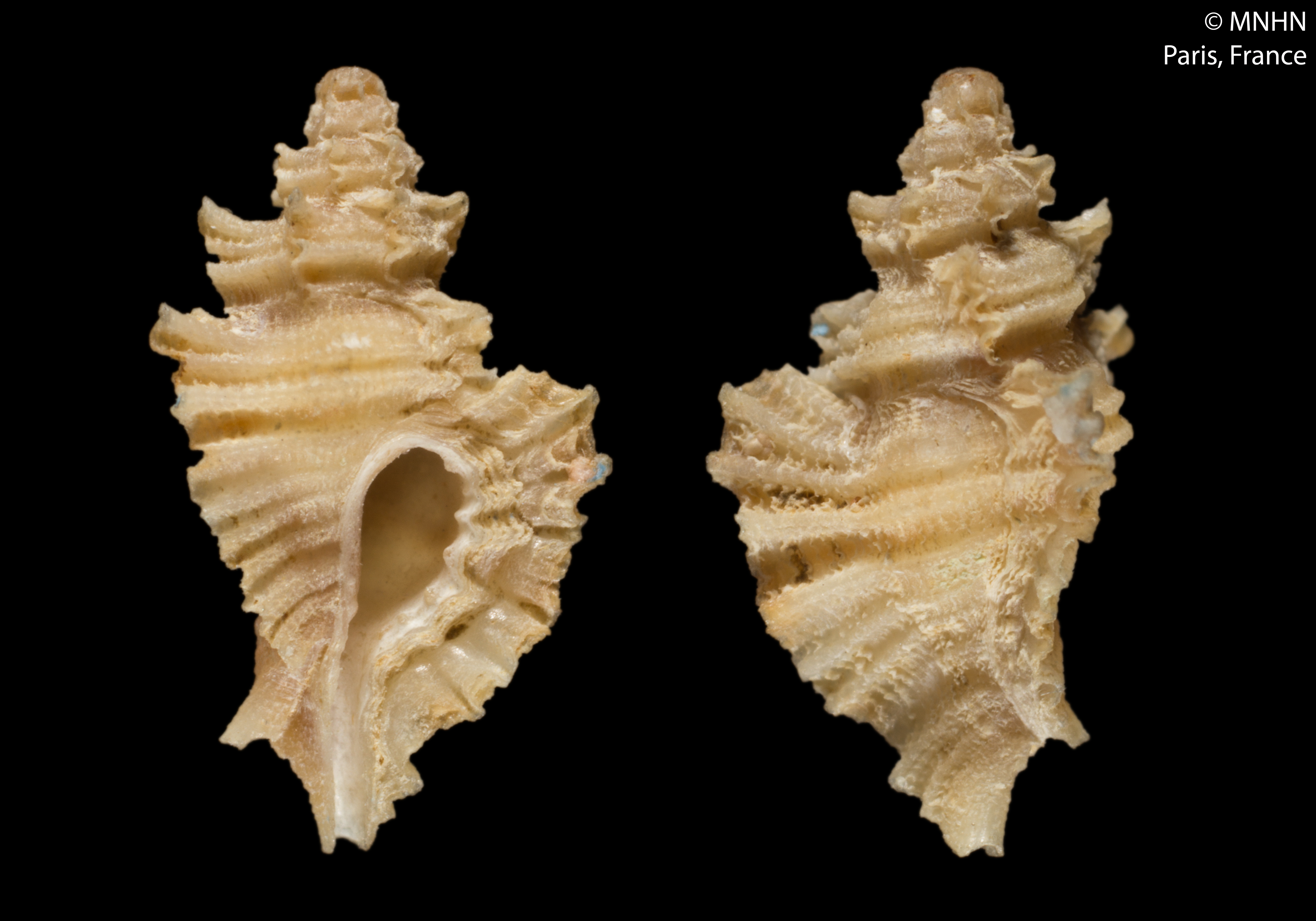
- Shell of Pygmaepterys menoui (holotype at MNHN, Paris)

Scientific classification
- Kingdom: Animalia
- Phylum: Mollusca
- Class: Gastropoda
- Subclass: Caenogastropoda
- Order: Neogastropoda
- Family: Muricidae
- Genus: Pygmaepterys
- Species: P. menoui

Binomial name
- Pygmaepterys menoui (Houart, 1990)

Synonyms
- Favartia (Pygmaepterys) menoui (Houart, 1990); Favartia menoui (Houart, 1990)

= Pygmaepterys menoui =

Species of gastropod

Pygmaepterys menoui is a species of sea snail, a marine gastropod mollusc in the family Muricidae, the murex snails or rock snails.

== Distribution ==
This marine species occurs off New Caledonia
