= Pygmaepterys kurodai =

Scientific classification
- Kingdom: Animalia
- Phylum: Mollusca
- Class: Gastropoda
- Subclass: Caenogastropoda
- Order: Neogastropoda
- Family: Muricidae
- Genus: Pygmaepterys
- Species: P. kurodai

Binomial name
- Pygmaepterys kurodai Nakamigawa & Habe, 1964

Synonyms
- Favartia (Pygmaepterys) kurodai Nakamigawa & Habe, 1964; Favartia kurodai Nakamigawa & Habe, 1964

Species of gastropod

Pygmaepterys kurodai is a species of sea snail, a marine gastropod mollusc in the family Muricidae, the murex snails or rock snails.

== Distribution ==
This marine species occurs off Honshu Island, Japan.
