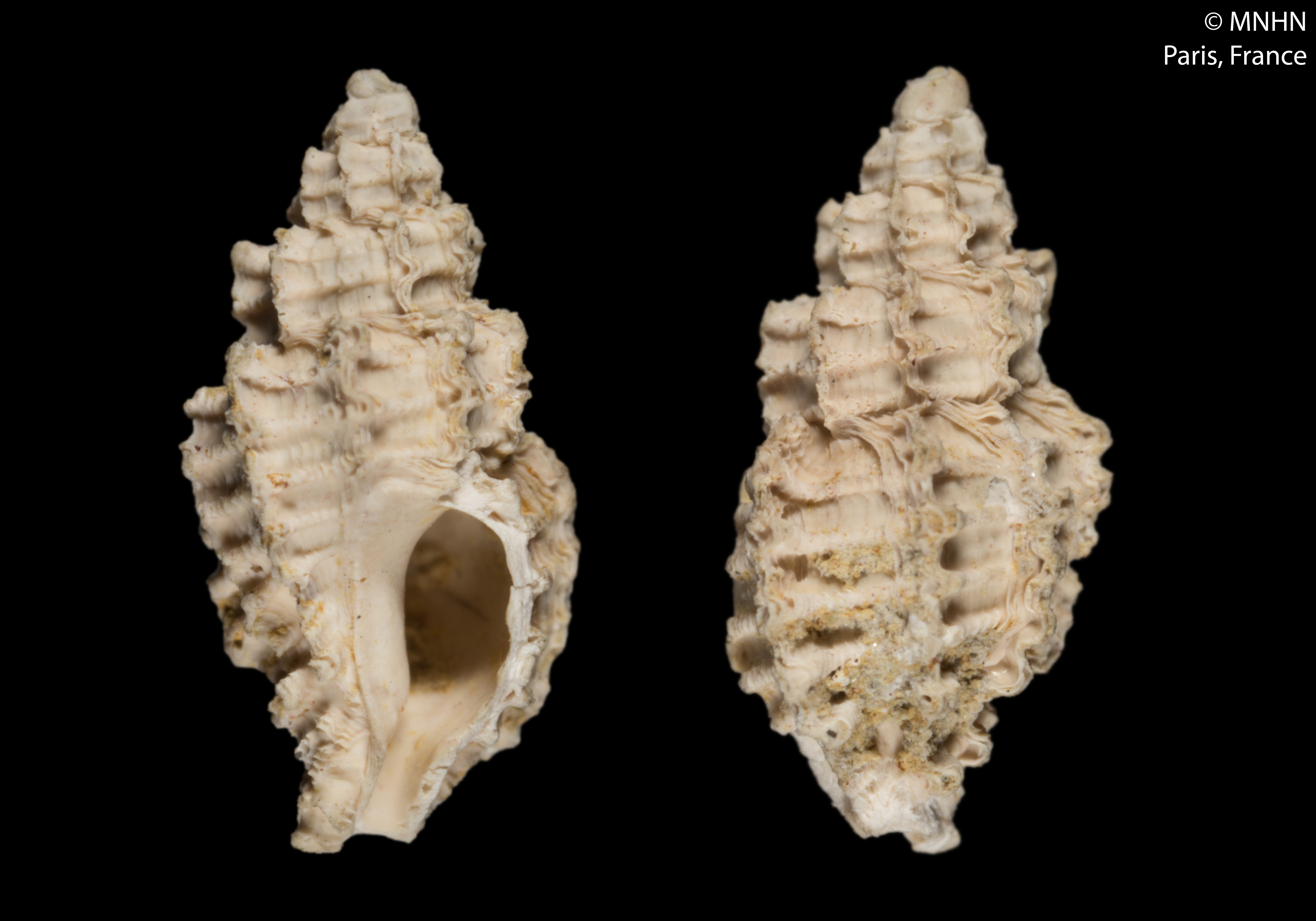
- Shell of Pygmaepterys aturensis (holotype at MNHN, Paris)

Scientific classification
- Kingdom: Animalia
- Phylum: Mollusca
- Class: Gastropoda
- Subclass: Caenogastropoda
- Order: Neogastropoda
- Superfamily: Muricoidea
- Family: Muricidae
- Subfamily: Muricopsinae
- Genus: Pygmaepterys; E. H. Vokes, 1978

Type species
- Murex alfredensis Bartsch, 1915

Synonyms
- Favartia (Pygmaepterys) E. H. Vokes, 1978; Pterynotus (Pygmaepterys) E. H. Vokes, 1978 (basionym)

= Pygmaepterys =

Genus of gastropods

Pygmaepterys is a genus of sea snails, marine gastropod molluscs in the subfamily Muricopsinae of the family Muricidae, the murex snails or rock snails.

== Species ==
- Pygmaepterys adenensis (Houart & Wranik, 1989)
- Pygmaepterys alfredensis (Bartsch, 1915)
- Pygmaepterys aliceae (Petuch, 1987)
- †Pygmaepterys aturensis Lozouet, 1999
- Pygmaepterys avatea Houart & Tröndlé, 2008
- Pygmaepterys bellini (D'Attilio & Myers, 1985)
- Pygmaepterys cienaguero Espinosa & Ortea, 2018
- Pygmaepterys circinatus (Houart & Héros, 2012)
- Pygmaepterys cracentis (Houart, 1996)
- Pygmaepterys dhofarensis (Houart, Gori & Rosado, 2015)
- Pygmaepterys dondani (Kosuge, 1984)
- †Pygmaepterys exoletus Lozouet, 1999
- Pygmaepterys fournierae (Houart & Héros, 2013)
- Pygmaepterys funafutiensis (Hedley, 1899)
- Pygmaepterys germainae (Vokes & D'Attilio, 1980)
- Pygmaepterys habanensis Espinosa & Ortea, 2016
- Pygmaepterys isabelae Houart & Rosado, 2008
- Pygmaepterys juanitae (Gibson-Smith & Gibson-Smith, 1983)
- Pygmaepterys karukerensis Garrigues & Merle, 2014
- Pygmaepterys kernoi (Houart & Severns, 2013)
- Pygmaepterys kurodai Nakamigawa & Habe, 1964
- Pygmaepterys lifouensis (Houart & Héros, 2012)
- Pygmaepterys lourdesae (Gibson-Smith & Gibson-Smith, 1983)
- Pygmaepterys maestratii Garrigues & Lamy, 2019
- Pygmaepterys maraisi (Vokes, 1978)
- Pygmaepterys menoui (Houart, 1990)
- Pygmaepterys oxossi (Petuch, 1979)
- Pygmaepterys paulboschi Smythe & Houart, 1984
- Pygmaepterys philcloveri (Houart, 1984)
- Pygmaepterys pointieri Garrigues & Merle, 2014
- Pygmaepterys poormani Radwin & D'Attilio, 1976
- Pygmaepterys puillandrei Garrigues & Lamy, 2018
- Pygmaepterys rauli (Espinosa, 1990)
- Pygmaepterys richardbinghami (Petuch, 1987)
- Pygmaepterys tacoensis Espinosa & Ortea, 2016
- Pygmaepterys yemayaensis Espinosa & Ortea, 2016
- Pygmaepterys yemenensis (Houart & Wranik, 1989)
