= Pygmaepterys rauli =

Scientific classification
- Kingdom: Animalia
- Phylum: Mollusca
- Class: Gastropoda
- Subclass: Caenogastropoda
- Order: Neogastropoda
- Family: Muricidae
- Genus: Pygmaepterys
- Species: P. rauli

Binomial name
- Pygmaepterys rauli (Espinosa, 1990)

Synonyms
- Favartia (Pygmaepterys) rauli (Espinosa, 1990); Favartia rauli (Espinosa, 1990)

Species of gastropod

Pygmaepterys rauli is a species of sea snail, a marine gastropod mollusc in the family Muricidae, the murex snails or rock snails.

== Distribution ==
This species occurs in the Caribbean Sea off Cuba.
