= Muricopsis westonensis =

Scientific classification
- Kingdom: Animalia
- Phylum: Mollusca
- Class: Gastropoda
- Subclass: Caenogastropoda
- Order: Neogastropoda
- Family: Muricidae
- Genus: Muricopsis
- Species: M. westonensis

Binomial name
- Muricopsis westonensis Myers & D'Attilio, 1990

Synonyms
- Murexsul westonensis (Myers & D'Attilio, 1990)

Species of gastropod

Muricopsis westonensis is a species of sea snail, a marine gastropod mollusk in the family Muricidae, the murex snails or rock snails.
