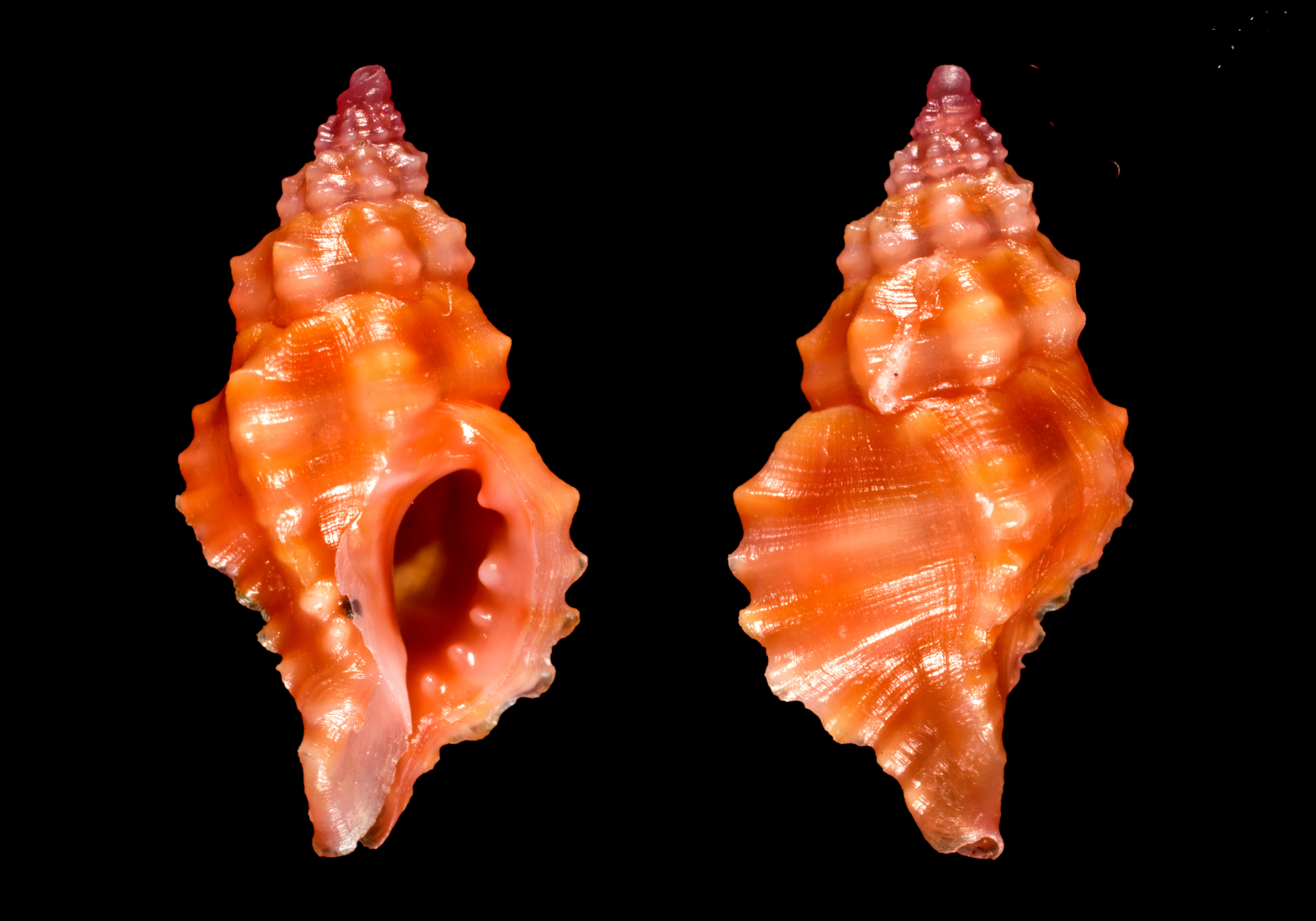
- Shell of Muricopsis gorii (holotype in the MNHN, Paris)

Scientific classification
- Kingdom: Animalia
- Phylum: Mollusca
- Class: Gastropoda
- Subclass: Caenogastropoda
- Order: Neogastropoda
- Family: Muricidae
- Genus: Muricopsis
- Species: M. gorii

Binomial name
- Muricopsis gorii Houart, 2012

= Muricopsis gorii =

Species of gastropod

Muricopsis gorii is a species of small sea snail, a marine gastropod mollusks in the family Muricidae, the rock snails.

This species was first described in 2012 based on specimens from the south of the island of São Tomé, São Tomé and Príncipe.

== Description ==
The length of the shell attains 8.6 mm.
