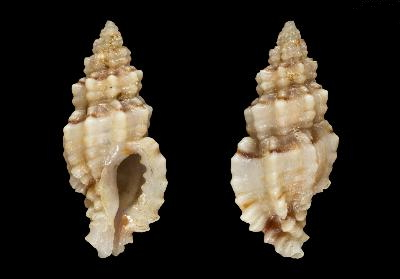
- Shell of Muricopsis haidari (holotype in the MNHN, Paris)

Scientific classification
- Kingdom: Animalia
- Phylum: Mollusca
- Class: Gastropoda
- Subclass: Caenogastropoda
- Order: Neogastropoda
- Family: Muricidae
- Genus: Muricopsis
- Species: M. haidari

Binomial name
- Muricopsis haidari Houart, 2003

Synonyms
- Muricopsis (Muricopsis) haidari Houart, 2003· accepted, alternate representation

= Muricopsis haidari =

Species of gastropod

Muricopsis haidari is a species of sea snail, a marine gastropod mollusk in the family Muricidae, the murex snails or rock snails.

== Description ==
The length of the shell attains 8.95 mm.

== Distribution ==
This marine species occurs off Senegal.
