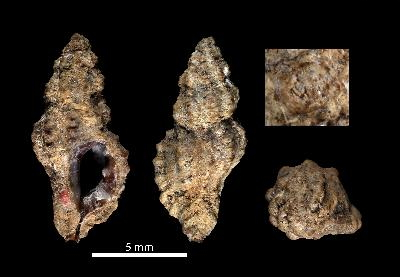
- Shell of Muricopsis rutila mariangelae (paratype in the MNHN, Paris)

Scientific classification
- Kingdom: Animalia
- Phylum: Mollusca
- Class: Gastropoda
- Subclass: Caenogastropoda
- Order: Neogastropoda
- Family: Muricidae
- Genus: Muricopsis
- Species: M. rutila

Binomial name
- Muricopsis rutila (Reeve, 1846)

Synonyms
- Muricopsis (Muricopsis) rutila (Reeve, 1846)· accepted, alternate representation; Muricopsis (Muricopsis) rutila rutila (Reeve, 1846)· accepted, alternate representation; Muricopsis (Risomurex) rutila (Reeve, 1846); Muricopsis rutila rutila (Reeve, 1846)· accepted, alternate representation; Ricinula rutila (Reeve, 1846)

= Muricopsis rutila =

Species of gastropod

Muricopsis rutila, common name : the beaded drupe, is a species of sea snail, a marine gastropod mollusk in the family Muricidae, the murex snails or rock snails.

== Subspecies ==
There are two subspecies:

- Muricopsis rutila mariangelae Rolan & Fernandes, 1991 : this subspecies is endemic to São Tomé and Príncipe
- Muricopsis rutila rutila (Reeve, 1846): this species is found in the Atlantic Ocean off Ghana: represented as Muricopsis rutila (Reeve, 1846)

== Description ==
The size of an adult shell varies between 10 mm and 20 mm.
