= Muricopsis withrowi =

Scientific classification
- Kingdom: Animalia
- Phylum: Mollusca
- Class: Gastropoda
- Subclass: Caenogastropoda
- Order: Neogastropoda
- Family: Muricidae
- Genus: Muricopsis
- Species: M. withrowi

Binomial name
- Muricopsis withrowi Vokes & Houart, 1986

Species of gastropod

Muricopsis (Risomurex) withrowi is a species of sea snail, a marine gastropod mollusk in the family Muricidae, the murex snails or rock snails.
