= Rolandiella umbilicatus =

Scientific classification
- Kingdom: Animalia
- Phylum: Mollusca
- Class: Gastropoda
- Subclass: Caenogastropoda
- Order: Neogastropoda
- Family: Muricidae
- Genus: Rolandiella
- Species: R. umbilicatus

Binomial name
- Rolandiella umbilicatus (Tenison-Woods, 1876)

Synonyms
- Murex angasi Tryon, 1880; Murex scalaris A. Adams, 1854; Trophon umbilicatus Tenison-Woods, 1876

Species of gastropod

Rolandiella umbilicatus is a species of sea snail, a marine gastropod mollusk in the family Muricidae, the murex snails or rock snails.
