= Muricopsis principensis =

Conservation status
- Data Deficient (IUCN 2.3)

Scientific classification
- Kingdom: Animalia
- Phylum: Mollusca
- Class: Gastropoda
- Subclass: Caenogastropoda
- Order: Neogastropoda
- Family: Muricidae
- Genus: Muricopsis
- Species: M. principensis

Binomial name
- Muricopsis principensis Rolan & Fernandes, 1991

Species of gastropod

Muricopsis principensis is a species of small sea snail, a marine gastropod mollusks in the family Muricidae, the rock snails.

This species occurs on the island of Príncipe, São Tomé and Príncipe, where it is endemic.
