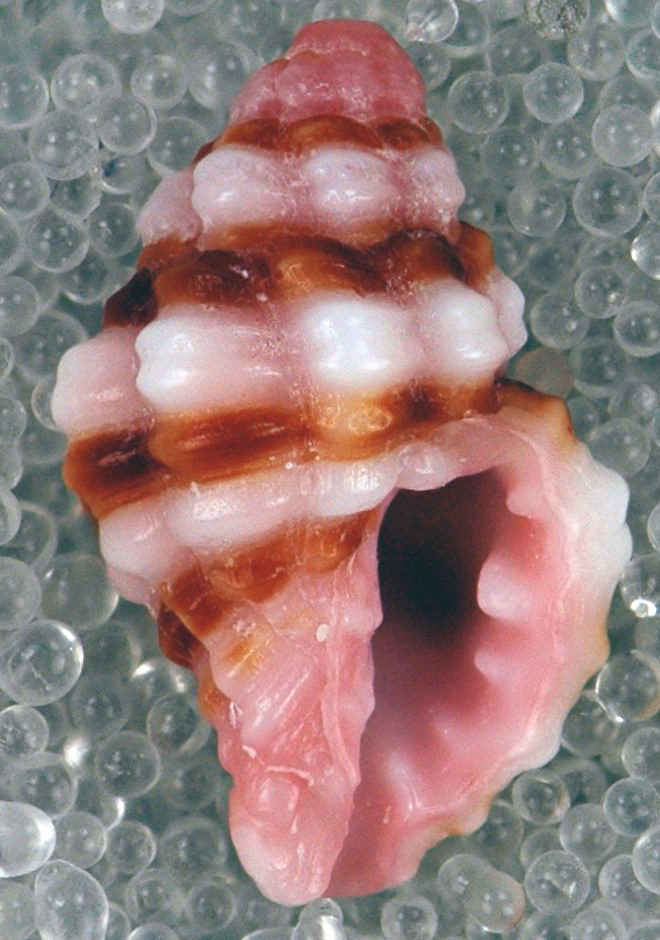

Scientific classification
- Kingdom: Animalia
- Phylum: Mollusca
- Class: Gastropoda
- Subclass: Caenogastropoda
- Order: Neogastropoda
- Family: Muricidae
- Genus: Muricopsis
- Species: M. rosea

Binomial name
- Muricopsis rosea (Reeve, 1846)

Synonyms
- Morula rosea (Reeve, 1846); Ricinula rosea Reeve, 1846 (basionym); Risomurex roseus (Reeve, 1846)

= Muricopsis rosea =

Species of gastropod

Muricopsis (Risomurex) rosea, common name the pink drupe, is a species of sea snail, a marine gastropod mollusk in the family Muricidae, the murex snails or rock snails.

== Description ==
The shell grows to a length of 15 mm

== Distribution ==
This species is distributed in the Caribbean Sea; the Gulf of Mexico; in the Indian Ocean along the Mascarene Basin.
