= Muricopsis testorii =

Scientific classification
- Kingdom: Animalia
- Phylum: Mollusca
- Class: Gastropoda
- Subclass: Caenogastropoda
- Order: Neogastropoda
- Family: Muricidae
- Genus: Muricopsis
- Species: M. testorii

Binomial name
- Muricopsis testorii Houart & Gori, 2008

Synonyms
- Muricopsis (Muricopsis) testorii Houart & Gori, 2008

Species of gastropod

Muricopsis testorii is a species of sea snail, a marine gastropod mollusk in the family Muricidae, the murex snails or rock snails.

The species was first described in 2008 from specimens found in the northwest of the island of São Tomé, São Tomé e Príncipe.
