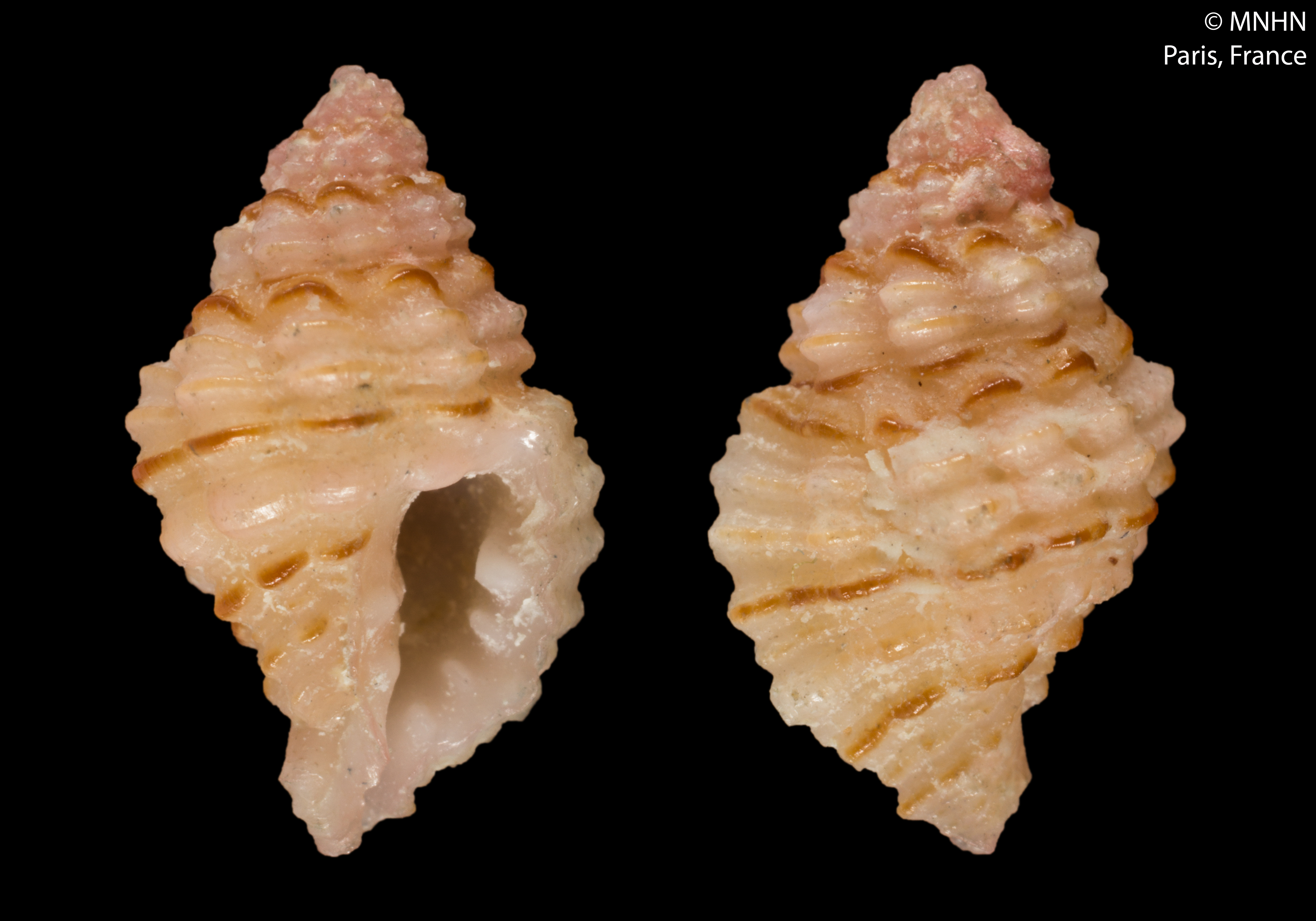
- Muricopsis schrammi shells

Scientific classification
- Kingdom: Animalia
- Phylum: Mollusca
- Class: Gastropoda
- Subclass: Caenogastropoda
- Order: Neogastropoda
- Family: Muricidae
- Genus: Muricopsis
- Species: M. schrammi

Binomial name
- Muricopsis schrammi (Crosse, 1863)

Synonyms
- Engina schrammi Crosse, 1863; Muricopsis (Risomurex) schrammi (Crosse, 1863)· accepted, alternate representation; Risomurex schrammi (Crosse, 1863)

= Muricopsis schrammi =

Species of gastropod

Muricopsis schrammi is a species of sea snail, a marine gastropod mollusk in the family Muricidae, the murex snails or rock snails.

== Description ==
The length of the shell attains 9 mm.

== Distribution ==
This marine species occurs off Guadeloupe.
