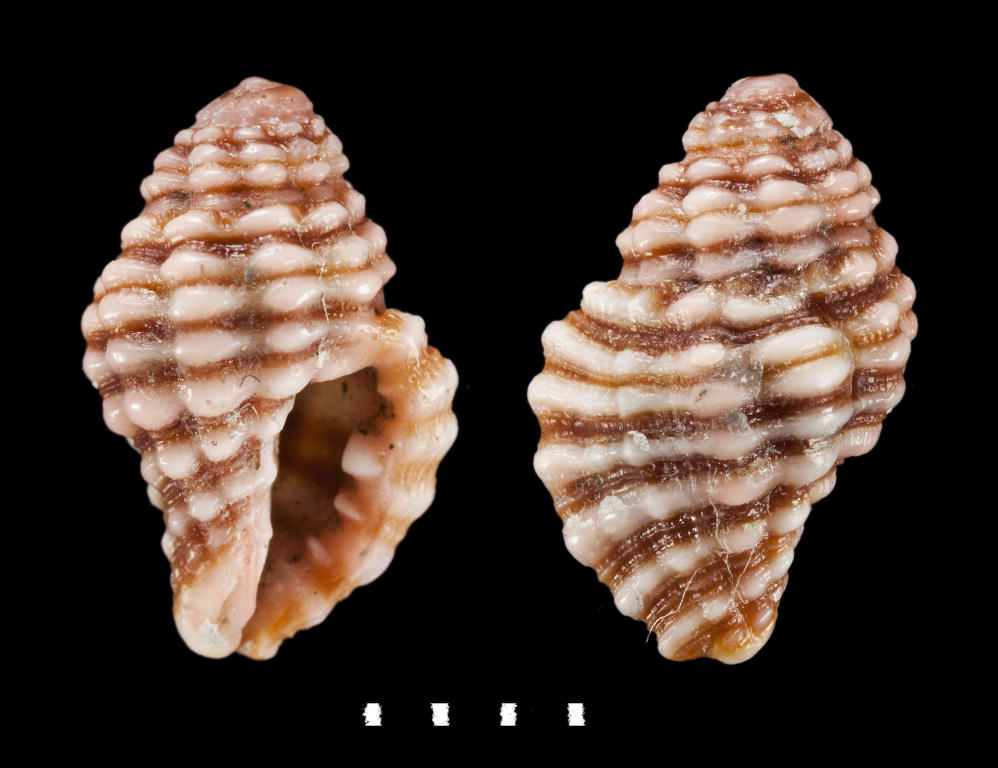
- Photograph of holotype in the Natural History Museum, London.
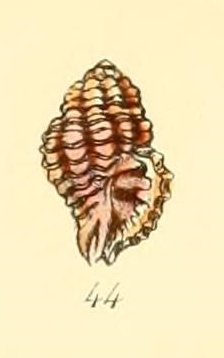
- G. B. Sowerby II's illustration in Reeve's initial description.

Scientific classification
- Kingdom: Animalia
- Phylum: Mollusca
- Class: Gastropoda
- Subclass: Caenogastropoda
- Order: Neogastropoda
- Family: Muricidae
- Genus: Muricopsis
- Species: M. deformis

Binomial name
- Muricopsis deformis (Reeve, 1846)

Synonyms
- Muricopsis (Risomurex) deformis (Reeve, 1846)· accepted, alternate representation; Ricinula deformis Reeve, 1846; Risomurex mosquitensis Kemperman & Coomans, 1984; Sistrum ferrugineus rubidum Dall, 1889

= Muricopsis deformis =

Species of gastropod

Muricopsis deformis is a species of sea snail, a marine gastropod mollusk in the family Muricidae, the murex snails or rock snails.

== Distribution ==
The type locality for its junior synonym, Risomurex mosquitensis is Puerto Vargas, Cahuita National Park, Mosquito Gulf, Costa Rica.
