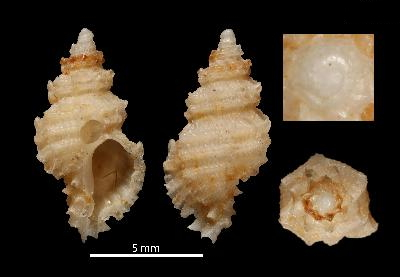
- Shell of Muricopsis annobonensis (paratype at MNHN, Päris)

Scientific classification
- Kingdom: Animalia
- Phylum: Mollusca
- Class: Gastropoda
- Subclass: Caenogastropoda
- Order: Neogastropoda
- Family: Muricidae
- Genus: Muricopsis
- Species: M. annobonensis

Binomial name
- Muricopsis annobonensis Houart & Rolán, 2001

Synonyms
- Muricopsis (Muricopsis) annobonensis Houart & Rolán, 2001

= Muricopsis annobonensis =

Species of gastropod

Muricopsis annobonensis is a species of sea snail, a marine gastropod mollusk in the family Muricidae, the murex snails or rock snails.

== Distribution ==
This marine species occurs in West Africa. The type locality is the island of Annobón, Gulf of Guinea.
