= Pygmaepterys dondani =

Scientific classification
- Kingdom: Animalia
- Phylum: Mollusca
- Class: Gastropoda
- Subclass: Caenogastropoda
- Order: Neogastropoda
- Family: Muricidae
- Genus: Pygmaepterys
- Species: P. dondani

Binomial name
- Pygmaepterys dondani (Kosuge, 1984)

Synonyms
- Favartia (Pygmaepterys) dondani (Kosuge, 1984); Favartia dondani (Kosuge, 1984); Pterochelus dondani Kosuge, 1984

Species of gastropod

Pygmaepterys dondani is a species of sea snail, a marine gastropod mollusc in the family Muricidae, the murex snails or rock snails.
