= Muricopsis ghisottii =

Scientific classification
- Kingdom: Animalia
- Phylum: Mollusca
- Class: Gastropoda
- Subclass: Caenogastropoda
- Order: Neogastropoda
- Family: Muricidae
- Genus: Muricopsis
- Species: M. ghisottii

Binomial name
- Muricopsis ghisottii Cecalupo, Buzzurro & Mariani, 2008

Synonyms
- Muricopsis ghisottii Cecalupo, Buzzurro & Mariani, 2008

Species of gastropod

Muricopsis (Muricopsis) ghisottii is a species of sea snail, a marine gastropod mollusk in the family Muricidae, the murex snails or rock snails.
