= Muricopsis gofasi =

Scientific classification
- Kingdom: Animalia
- Phylum: Mollusca
- Class: Gastropoda
- Subclass: Caenogastropoda
- Order: Neogastropoda
- Family: Muricidae
- Genus: Muricopsis
- Species: M. gofasi

Binomial name
- Muricopsis gofasi Houart, 1993

Synonyms
- Muricopsis (Muricopsis) gofasi Houart, 1993· accepted, alternate representation; Muricopsis (Risomurex) gofasi Houart, 1993

Species of gastropod

Muricopsis gofasi is a species of sea snail, a marine gastropod mollusk in the family Muricidae, the murex snails or rock snails.

== Distribution ==
This marine species occurs off Angola.
