= Pygmaepterys juanitae =

Scientific classification
- Kingdom: Animalia
- Phylum: Mollusca
- Class: Gastropoda
- Subclass: Caenogastropoda
- Order: Neogastropoda
- Family: Muricidae
- Genus: Pygmaepterys
- Species: P. juanitae

Binomial name
- Pygmaepterys juanitae (Gibson-Smith & Gibson-Smith, 1983)

Synonyms
- Favartia (Pygmaepterys) juanitae (J. Gibson-Smith & W. Gibson-Smith, 1983); Favartia juanitae (J. Gibson-Smith & W. Gibson-Smith, 1983)

Species of gastropod

Pygmaepterys juanitae is a species of sea snail, a marine gastropod mollusc in the family Muricidae, the murex snails or rock snails.

== Distribution ==
This species occurs in the Caribbean Sea off Venezuela
