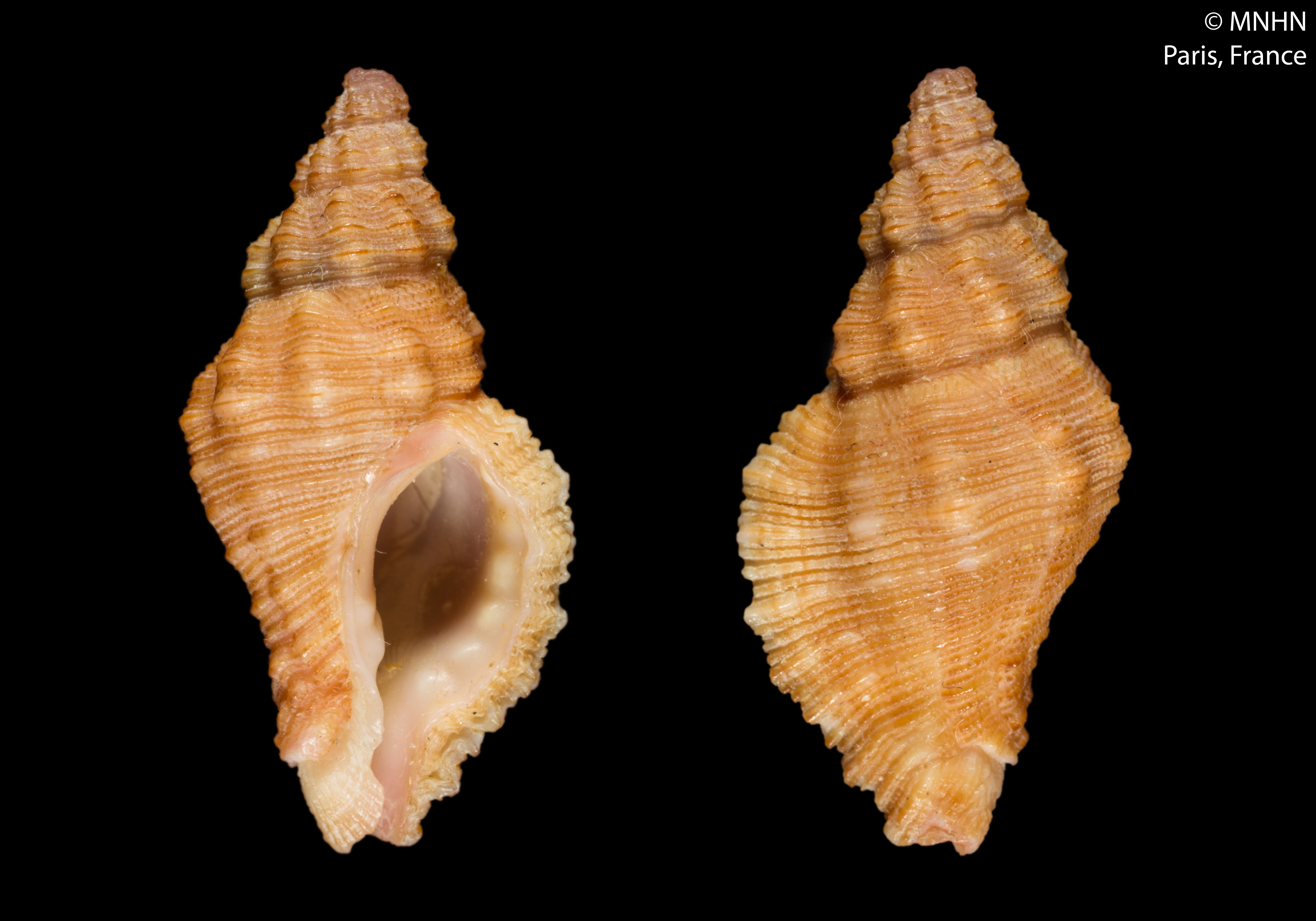

Scientific classification
- Kingdom: Animalia
- Phylum: Mollusca
- Class: Gastropoda
- Subclass: Caenogastropoda
- Order: Neogastropoda
- Family: Muricidae
- Genus: Muricopsis
- Species: M. chiarae

Binomial name
- Muricopsis chiarae Bozzetti, 1991

Synonyms
- Muricopsis chiarae Bozzetti, 1991

= Muricopsis chiarae =

Muricopsis (Muricopsis) chiarae

Species of gastropod

Muricopsis (Muricopsis) chiarae is a species of sea snail, a marine gastropod mollusk in the family Muricidae, the murex snails or rock snails.

== Description ==
Original description: "Shell medium sized for the Genus, fusiform. Spire high, slender, with five moderately convex teleoconch whorls. Protoconch unknown. Suture distinct. Aperture moderately large, lenticular. Aperture varix expanded with uneven profile. Outer lip thickened, with crenulated margin reflecting sculpture of preceding shell surface.
Inside of aperture with six denticles. Columellar lip callous, well separated, with two plicae on adapical part, one on abapical part, otherwise smooth. Sculpture consisting of eight tuberculated axial ribs on each teleoconch whorl and of numerous dense spiral striae of a microgranulose structure. Granules blend together on tubercules, giving rise to smooth surface.
Ground colour red; spiral striae dark brown on axial ribs, with dotted colouring on intratubercular area and uniform colouring on tubercules. Peristome pale pink."

== Distribution ==
Locus typicus: "Off Capo Ras Hafun, Horn of Africa, Somalia."

This marine species occurs off Somalia
