= Muricopsis hernandezi =

Scientific classification
- Kingdom: Animalia
- Phylum: Mollusca
- Class: Gastropoda
- Subclass: Caenogastropoda
- Order: Neogastropoda
- Family: Muricidae
- Genus: Muricopsis
- Species: M. hernandezi

Binomial name
- Muricopsis hernandezi Rolán & Gori, 2007

Synonyms
- Muricopsis hernandezi Rolán & Gori, 2007

Species of gastropod

Muricopsis (Muricopsis) hernandezi is a species of sea snail, a marine gastropod mollusk in the family Muricidae, the murex snails or rock snails.

The species occurs on the island of São Tomé.
