= Muricopsis mcleani =

Scientific classification
- Kingdom: Animalia
- Phylum: Mollusca
- Class: Gastropoda
- Subclass: Caenogastropoda
- Order: Neogastropoda
- Family: Muricidae
- Genus: Muricopsis
- Species: M. mcleani

Binomial name
- Muricopsis mcleani Wiedrick, 2009

Synonyms
- Muricopsis (Muricopsis) mcleani Wiedrick, 2009

Species of gastropod

Muricopsis (Muricopsis) mcleani is a species of sea snail, a marine gastropod mollusk in the family Muricidae, the murex snails or rock snails.

== Description ==
Muricopsis (Muricopsis) mcleani Wiedrick, 2009 is a minute marine mollusk from the family Muricidae, subfamily Muricopsinae and in found in the Panamic Province. In comparison to other similar species in the genus, from this region, M. (M.) mcleani is moderately sized, has one tabulate whorl, varices sharp, bladelike and three dark brown bands on a tan background.

== Distribution ==
Distribution is from San Carlos, Sonora, Mexico, southwest to Mulege, Baja California Sur and south to Espiritu Santo Island, Gulf of California; Isla Santa Cruz, Galapagos Islands, intertidal to 82 m.
