= Pygmaepterys poormani =

Scientific classification
- Kingdom: Animalia
- Phylum: Mollusca
- Class: Gastropoda
- Subclass: Caenogastropoda
- Order: Neogastropoda
- Family: Muricidae
- Genus: Pygmaepterys
- Species: P. poormani

Binomial name
- Pygmaepterys poormani Radwin & D'Attilio, 1976

Synonyms
- Favartia (Pygmaepterys) poormani Radwin & D'Attilio, 1976; Favartia poormani Radwin & D'Attilio, 1976

Species of gastropod

Pygmaepterys poormani is a species of sea snail, a marine gastropod mollusc in the family Muricidae, the murex snails or rock snails.
