= Pygmaepterys adenensis =

Scientific classification
- Kingdom: Animalia
- Phylum: Mollusca
- Class: Gastropoda
- Subclass: Caenogastropoda
- Order: Neogastropoda
- Family: Muricidae
- Genus: Pygmaepterys
- Species: P. adenensis

Binomial name
- Pygmaepterys adenensis (Houart & Wranik, 1989)

Synonyms
- Favartia (Pygmaepterys) adenensis (Houart & Wranik, 1989); Favartia adenensis Houart & Wranik, 1989

Species of gastropod

Pygmaepterys adenensis is a species of sea snail, a marine gastropod mollusc in the family Muricidae, the murex snails or rock snails.
