= Murexsul huberti =

Scientific classification
- Kingdom: Animalia
- Phylum: Mollusca
- Class: Gastropoda
- Subclass: Caenogastropoda
- Order: Neogastropoda
- Family: Muricidae
- Genus: Murexsul
- Species: M. huberti

Binomial name
- Murexsul huberti (Radwin & D'Attilio, 1976)

Synonyms
- Muricopsis duffyi Petuch, 1992; Muricopsis huberti Radwin & D'Attilio, 1976

Species of gastropod

Murexsul huberti is a species of sea snail, a marine gastropod mollusk in the family Muricidae, the murex snails or rock snails.
