= Pygmaepterys oxossi =

Scientific classification
- Kingdom: Animalia
- Phylum: Mollusca
- Class: Gastropoda
- Subclass: Caenogastropoda
- Order: Neogastropoda
- Family: Muricidae
- Genus: Pygmaepterys
- Species: P. oxossi

Binomial name
- Pygmaepterys oxossi (Petuch, 1979)

Synonyms
- Favartia (Pygmaepterys) oxossi (Petuch, 1979); Favartia oxossi (Petuch, 1979); Muricopsis oxossi Petuch, 1979

Species of gastropod

Pygmaepterys oxossi is a species of sea snail, a marine gastropod mollusc in the family Muricidae, the murex snails or rock snails.

== Distribution ==
This species occurs in the Atlantic Ocean off Brazil.
