= Pygmaepterys aliceae =

Scientific classification
- Kingdom: Animalia
- Phylum: Mollusca
- Class: Gastropoda
- Subclass: Caenogastropoda
- Order: Neogastropoda
- Family: Muricidae
- Genus: Pygmaepterys
- Species: P. aliceae

Binomial name
- Pygmaepterys aliceae (Petuch, 1987)

Synonyms
- Favartia (Pygmaepterys) aliceae (Petuch, 1987); Favartia aliceae (Petuch, 1987); Muricopsis aliceae Petuch, 1987

Species of gastropod

Pygmaepterys aliceae is a species of sea snail, a marine gastropod mollusc in the family Muricidae, the murex snails or rock snails.

== Description ==
Original description: "Shell small for genus, elongated, with high, elevated spire; 6 fimbriated varices per whorl; varices with 6 short, bladelike serrations; intervarical areas and backs of varices of body whorl with 6 large, raised, fimbriated spiral cords; inside of lip with 6 large denticles; shell color pure white (holotype encrusted with the red foraminiferan Homotrema rubrum)."

== Distribution ==
Locus typicus: "Bonaire Isl., Netherlands Antilles."

This species occurs in the Caribbean Sea off Bonaire.
