= Pygmaepterys bellini =

Scientific classification
- Kingdom: Animalia
- Phylum: Mollusca
- Class: Gastropoda
- Subclass: Caenogastropoda
- Order: Neogastropoda
- Family: Muricidae
- Genus: Pygmaepterys
- Species: P. bellini

Binomial name
- Pygmaepterys bellini (D'Attilio & Myers, 1985)

Synonyms
- Favartia (Pygmaepterys) bellini (D'Attilio & B. W. Myers, 1985)· accepted, alternate representation; Favartia bellini (D'Attilio & B. W. Myers, 1985)

Species of gastropod

Pygmaepterys bellini is a species of sea snail, a marine gastropod mollusc in the family Muricidae, the murex snails or rock snails.

== Distribution ==
The type specimen was collected off of Okinawa, Japan.
