= Rolandiella =

Scientific classification
- Kingdom: Animalia
- Phylum: Mollusca
- Class: Gastropoda
- Subclass: Caenogastropoda
- Order: Neogastropoda
- Family: Muricidae
- Subfamily: Muricopsinae
- Genus: Rolandiella; Marshall & Burch, 2000

Genus of gastropods

Rolandiella is a genus of sea snails, marine gastropod mollusks in the family Muricidae, the murex snails or rock snails.

== Species ==
Species within the genus Rolandiella include:

- Rolandiella scotti (Marshall & Burch, 2000)
- Rolandiella umbilicatus (Tenison-Woods, 1876)
