= Pygmaepterys richardbinghami =

Scientific classification
- Kingdom: Animalia
- Phylum: Mollusca
- Class: Gastropoda
- Subclass: Caenogastropoda
- Order: Neogastropoda
- Family: Muricidae
- Genus: Pygmaepterys
- Species: P. richardbinghami

Binomial name
- Pygmaepterys richardbinghami (Petuch, 1987)

Synonyms
- Favartia (Pygmaepterys) richardbinghami (Petuch, 1987); Favartia richardbinghami (Petuch, 1987); Muricopsis richardbinghami Petuch, 1987

Species of gastropod

Pygmaepterys richardbinghami is a species of sea snail, a marine gastropod mollusc in the family Muricidae, the murex snails or rock snails.

== Description ==
Original description: "Shell fusiform, elongated with elevated spire; shell with 8 varices per whorl; body whorl ornamented with 5 large, evenly-spaced, raised cords; siphonal canal with 4 cords; spire whorls with 3 spiral cords; shoulder tabulate, sharp-angled; varices thin, winglike, with 5 large bladelike serrations; serrations correspond to cords in intervarical regions; posteriormost serration largest, spinelike, pointed posteriorly; aperture small, oval; outer lip thickened, with 5 large denticles along inner edge; shell color tan, with 2 thin reddish-brown bands, 1 around subsutural region and 1 around break between body whorl and siphonal canal; spire whorls with reddish-brown sub-sutural band; interior of aperture pale tan."

The shell size is 17 mm.

== Distribution ==
Locus typicus: "Off Palm Beach Island, Palm Beach, Florida, USA."

This species occurs in the Gulf of Mexico off Eastern Florida
