= Murexsul oxytatus =

Scientific classification
- Kingdom: Animalia
- Phylum: Mollusca
- Class: Gastropoda
- Subclass: Caenogastropoda
- Order: Neogastropoda
- Family: Muricidae
- Genus: Murexsul
- Species: M. oxytatus

Binomial name
- Murexsul oxytatus (M. Smith, 1938)

Synonyms
- Murex hexagonus Lamarck, 1816; Murex hexagonus var. oxytata M. Smith, 1938

Species of gastropod

Image of a specimen of the shell of the species described in the article, and cards with identifying and taxonomic information.

Murexsul oxytatus is a species of sea snail, a marine gastropod mollusk in the family Muricidae, the murex snails or rock snails.

== Description ==
Shell size 30-35 mm.

== Distribution ==
Western Atlantic Ocean: Vieques Island, Puerto Rico.
