= Pazinotus oliverai =

Scientific classification
- Kingdom: Animalia
- Phylum: Mollusca
- Class: Gastropoda
- Subclass: Caenogastropoda
- Order: Neogastropoda
- Family: Muricidae
- Genus: Pazinotus
- Species: P. oliverai

Binomial name
- Pazinotus oliverai (Kosuge, 1984)

Synonyms
- Flexopteron oliverai (Kosuge, 1984); Muricopsis oliverai Kosuge, 1984; Paziella oliverai (Kosuge, 1984); Pazinotus oliverae; Poirieria (Flexopteron) oliverai (Kosuge, 1984)

Species of gastropod

Pazinotus oliverai is a species of sea snail, a marine gastropod mollusc in the family Muricidae.
