= Murexsul mariae =

Muexsul mariae

Scientific classification
- Kingdom: Animalia
- Phylum: Mollusca
- Class: Gastropoda
- Subclass: Caenogastropoda
- Order: Neogastropoda
- Family: Muricidae
- Genus: Murexsul
- Species: M. mariae

Binomial name
- Murexsul mariae (Finlay, 1930)

Synonyms
- Muricopsis espinosus mariaeFinlay, 1930

Species of gastropod

Murexsul mariae is a species of medium-sized sea snail, a predatory marine gastropod mollusc in the Family Muricidae, the murex snails or rock snails.

== Distribution ==
It occurs along the coast of North Island, New Zealand.
