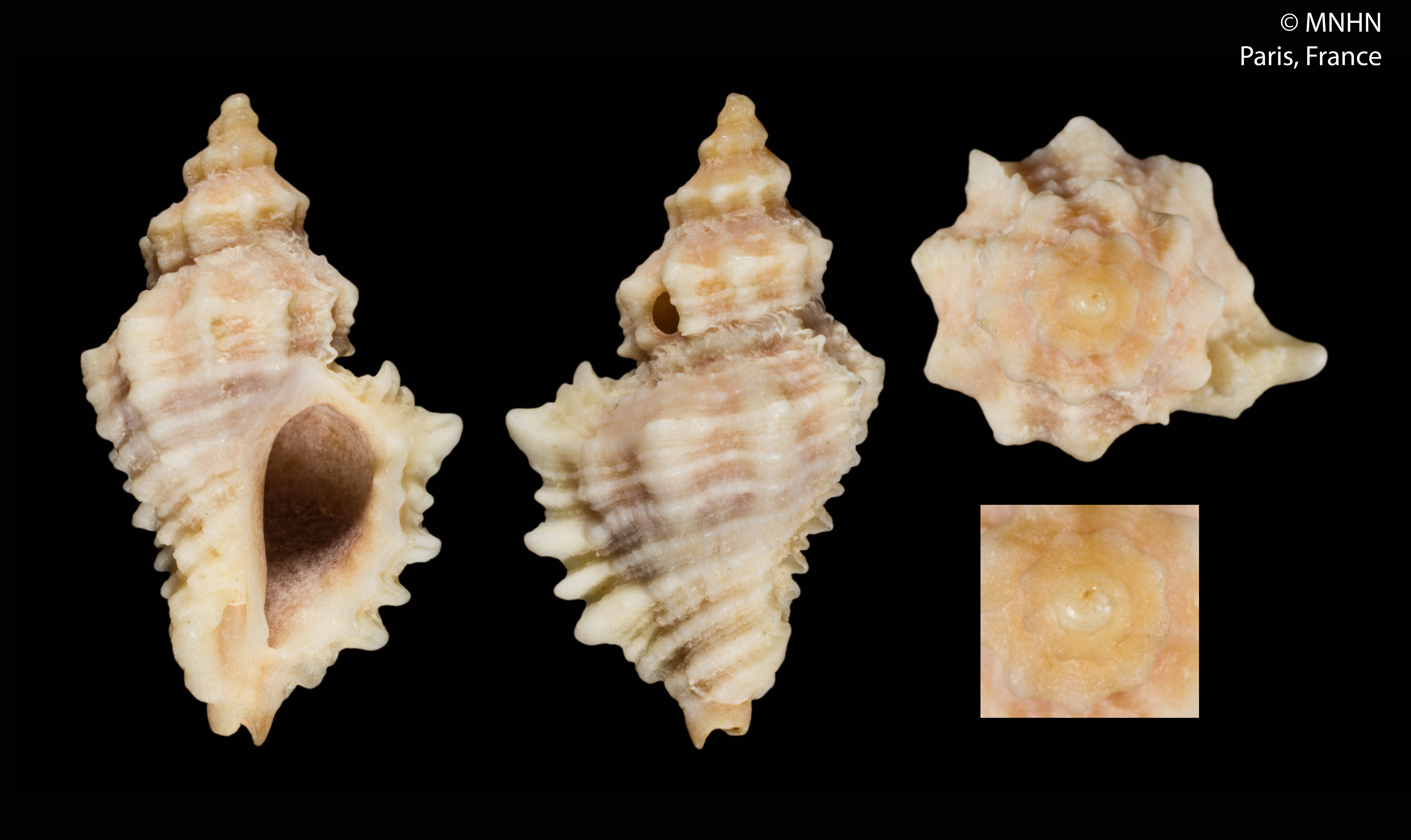
- Shell of Ocenebra hispidula (syntype at MNHN, Paris)

Scientific classification
- Kingdom: Animalia
- Phylum: Mollusca
- Class: Gastropoda
- Subclass: Caenogastropoda
- Order: Neogastropoda
- Family: Muricidae
- Genus: Ocenebra
- Species: O. hispidula

Binomial name
- Ocenebra hispidula (Pallary, 1904)

Synonyms
- Murex acanthophorus Monterosato, 1875; Murex erroneus Monterosato in Poirier, 1883; Muricopsis erroneus Monterosato in Settepassi, 1977; Muricopsis hispidula (Pallary, 1904); Muricopsis hispidulus (Pallary, 1904); Muricopsis personatus Monterosato in Settepassi, 1977; Ocenebra erronea (Monterosato in Poirier, 1883); Ocinebrina edwardsi var. albina Pallary, 1906; Ocinebrina edwardsi var. cincta Pallary, 1906; Ocinebrina edwardsi var. hispidula Pallary, 1904; Ocinebrina edwardsi var. mutica Pallary, 1906; Ocinebrina erronea (Settepassi, 1977); Ocinebrina hispidula (Pallary, 1904)

= Ocenebra hispidula =

Species of gastropod

Ocenebra hispidula is a species of sea snail, a marine gastropod mollusk in the family Muricidae, the murex snails or rock snails.

== Description ==
The length of the shell attains 21.9 mm.

== Distribution ==
This marine species occurs mainly in the Mediterranean Sea off Tunisia.
