= Rolandiella scotti =

Scientific classification
- Kingdom: Animalia
- Phylum: Mollusca
- Class: Gastropoda
- Subclass: Caenogastropoda
- Order: Neogastropoda
- Family: Muricidae
- Genus: Rolandiella
- Species: R. scotti

Binomial name
- Rolandiella scotti (Marshall & Burch, 2000)

Synonyms
- Muricopsis (Rolandiella) scotti Marshall & Burch, 2000

Species of gastropod

Rolandiella scotti is a species of sea snail, a marine gastropod mollusk in the family Muricidae, the murex snails or rock snails.
