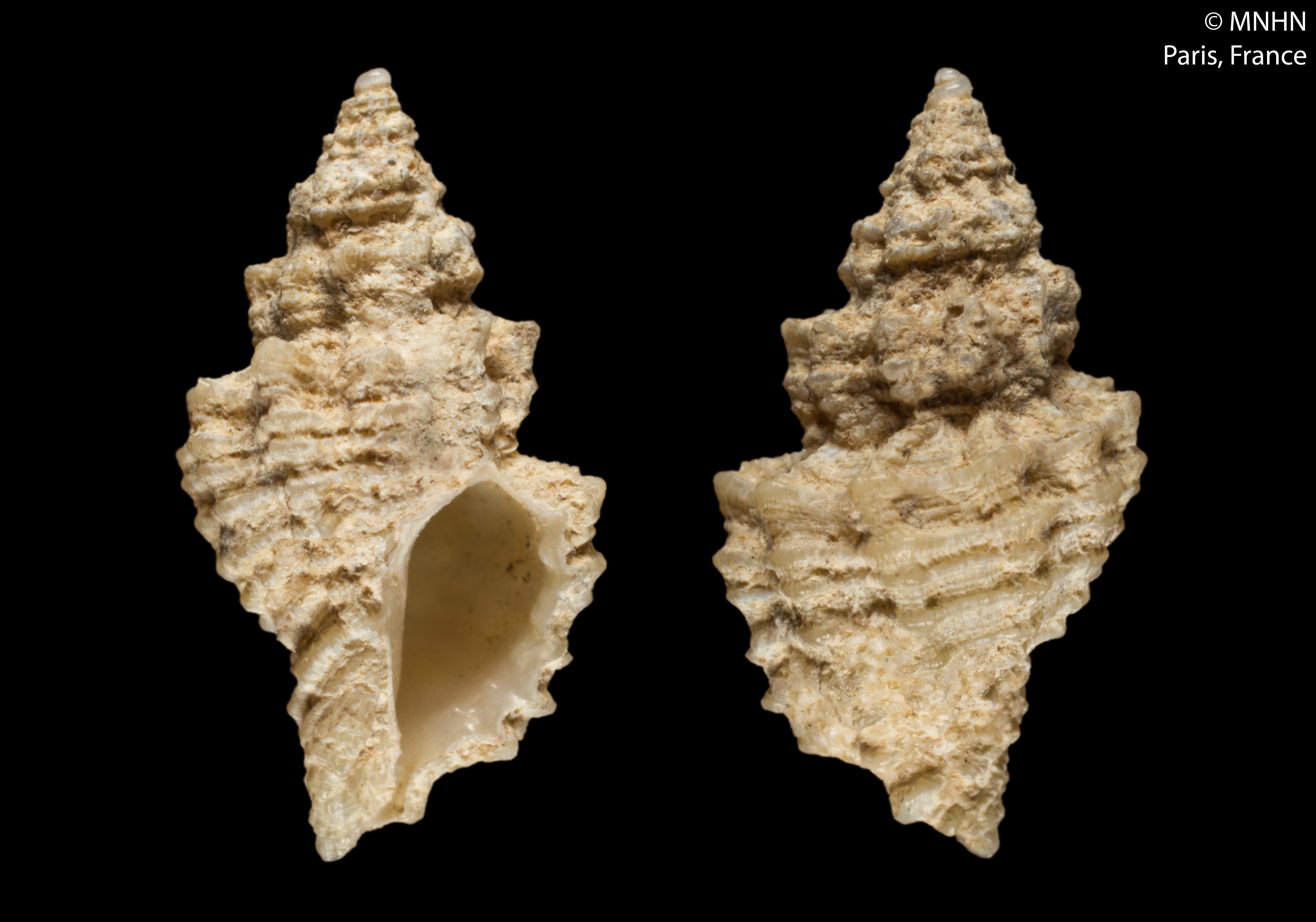
- Shell of Murexsul aradasii (syntype at MNHN, Paris)

Scientific classification
- Kingdom: Animalia
- Phylum: Mollusca
- Class: Gastropoda
- Subclass: Caenogastropoda
- Order: Neogastropoda
- Family: Muricidae
- Genus: Murexsul
- Species: M. aradasii

Binomial name
- Murexsul aradasii (Monterosato in Poirier, 1883)

Synonyms
- Murex aradasii Monterosato in Poirier, 1883; Murex cyclopus Benoit in Monterosato, 1884; Murex diadema Aradas & Benoit, 1876; Murex labiosus var. fasciata Coen, 1933; Murex medicago Watson, 1897; Murex spinulosus Costa, 1861 (not Deshayes, 1835); Muricidea spinulosa (Costa O.G., 1861); Muricidea spinulosa var. scalata Monterosato, 1884; Muricopsis aradasii (Poirier, 1883); Muricopsis diadema (Aradas & Benoit, 1876); Muricopsis diadema var. elongatus Settepassi, 1977; Muricopsis diadema var. horridaus Settepassi, 1977; Muricopsis diadema var. muticus Monterosato in Settepassi, 1977; Muricopsis diadema var. robustus Settepassi, 1977; Muricopsis medicago (Watson, 1897); Muricopsis spinulosa (Costa O.G., 1861)

= Murexsul aradasii =

Species of gastropod

Murexsul aradasii is a species of sea snail, a marine gastropod mollusk in the family Muricidae, the murex snails or rock snails.

== Description ==
The shell size varies between 7 mm and 18 mm.

== Distribution ==
This species is distributed in European waters along Madeira and the Canary Islands and in the Mediterranean Sea along Greece.
