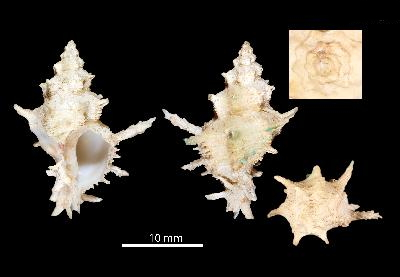
- Shell of Murexsul ianlochi (holotype in the MNHN, Paris)

Scientific classification
- Kingdom: Animalia
- Phylum: Mollusca
- Class: Gastropoda
- Subclass: Caenogastropoda
- Order: Neogastropoda
- Superfamily: Muricoidea
- Family: Muricidae
- Subfamily: Muricopsinae
- Genus: Murexsul; Iredale, 1915

Type species
- Murex octogonus Quoy & Gaimard, 1833

Synonyms
- Hexaplex (Murexsul) Iredale, 1915 (original rank); Murex (Murexsul); Murexsul (Murexsul) Iredale, 1915; Muricopsis (Murexsul) Iredale, 1915

= Murexsul =

Genus of gastropods

Murexsul is a genus of sea snails, marine gastropod mollusks in the subfamily Muricopsinae of the family Muricidae, the murex snails or rock snails.

== Species ==
Species within the genus Murexsul include:

- Murexsul aikeni Lussi, 2010
- Murexsul apollo Espinosa & Ortea, 2016
- Murexsul aradasii (Monterosato in Poirier, 1883)
- Murexsul armatus (A. Adams, 1854)
- Murexsul asper Houart, 2004
- Murexsul auratus Kuroda & Habe, 1971
- Murexsul bargibanti (Houart, 1991)
- Murexsul cachoi Espinosa & Ortea, 2016
- Murexsul cevikeri (Houart, 2000)
- Murexsul charcoti (Houart, 1991)
- Murexsul chesleri Houart, 2006
- † Murexsul clifdenensis Finlay, 1930
- Murexsul coffeebayensis Lussi, 2010
- Murexsul cubacaribaensis Espinosa & Ortea, 2016
- Murexsul cuspidatus (G.B. Sowerby II, 1879)
- Murexsul diamantinus (Houart, 1991)
- † Murexsul dilucidus Marwick, 1931
- Murexsul dipsacus (Broderip, 1833)
- † Murexsul echinophorus Powell & Bartrum, 1929
- Murexsul eduardoi Espinosa & Ortea, 2018
- Murexsul elatensis (Emerson & D'Attilio, 1979)
- Murexsul emipowlusi (Abbott, 1954)
- Murexsul espinosus (Hutton, 1885)
- Murexsul harasewychi Petuch, 1987
- Murexsul huberti (Radwin & D'Attilio, 1976)
- Murexsul ianlochi Houart, 1986
- Murexsul interserratus (G.B. Sowerby II, 1879)
- Murexsul jacquelinae Emerson & D'Attilio, 1969
- Murexsul jahami Merle & Garrigues, 2011
- Murexsul jaliscoensis (Radwin & D'Attilio, 1970)
- Murexsul khareefae Houart & Moolenbeek, 2012
- Murexsul kieneri (Reeve, 1845)
- Murexsul leonardi (Houart, 1993)
- Murexsul mananteninaensis Houart & Héros, 2015
- Murexsul mariae Finlay, 1930
- † Murexsul marwicki Maxwell, 1971
- Murexsul mbotyiensis (Houart, 1991)
- Murexsul merlei Houart & Héros, 2008
- Murexsul metivieri (Houart, 1988)
- Murexsul micra (Houart, 2001)
- Murexsul mildredae (Poorman, 1980)
- † Murexsul minor Lozouet, 1999
- Murexsul multispinosus (Sowerby, 1904)
- Murexsul nothokieneri Vokes, 1978
- Murexsul octogonus (Quoy & Gaimard, 1833)
- Murexsul oxytatus (M. Smith, 1938)
- Murexsul pacaudi Van Hyfte & Danvin, 2018
- Murexsul planiliratus (Reeve, 1845)
- † Murexsul praegressus Finlay, 1930
- † Murexsul pregenitor Laws, 1935
- † Murexsul primigenius Merle & Pacaud, 2019
- † Murexsul proavitus Laws, 1935
- Murexsul profundus (Marshall & Burch, 2000)
- Murexsul purpurispinus (Ponder, 1972)
- Murexsul queenslandicus Houart, 2004
- Murexsul reunionensis Houart, 1985
- † Murexsul rostralis (Grateloup, 1847)
- † Murexsul scobina Finlay, 1930
- Murexsul skoglundae (Myers, Hertz & D'Attilio, 1993)
- Murexsul spiculus (Houart, 1987)
- Murexsul sunderlandi (Petuch, 1987)
- Murexsul tokubeii Nakamigawa & Habe, 1964
  - Murexsul tokubeii marianae (Houart, 2003)
  - Murexsul tokubeii tokubeii Nakamigawa & Habe, 1964
- Murexsul tulensis (Radwin & D'Attilio, 1976)
- Murexsul valae (Houart, 1991)
- Murexsul warreni (Petuch, 1993)
- Murexsul zonatus Hayashi & Habe, 1965
- Murexsul zylmanae (Petuch, 1993)

Species brought into synonymy

- Murexsul conatus McMichael, 1964: synonym of Hexaplex conatus (McMichael, 1964) (original combination)
- Murexsul cuvierensis Finlay, 1927: synonym of Murexsul octogonus (Quoy & Gaimard, 1833)
- Murexsul hexagonus (Lamarck, 1816): synonym of Murexsul pacaudi Van Hyfte & Danvin, 2018
- † Murexsul lividorupis Laws, 1935: synonym of † Coralliophila lividorupis (Laws, 1935) (original combination)
- † Murexsul tepikiensis Powell, 1934: synonym of Coralliophila mira (Cotton & Godfrey, 1932)
- Murexsul westonensis (Myers & D'Attilio, 1990): synonym of Muricopsis westonensis B. W. Myers & D'Attilio, 1990
- Murexsul zeteki (Hertlein & Strong, 1951): synonym of Muricopsis zeteki Hertlein & A. M. Strong, 1951
