= M. profunda =

M. profunda may refer to:

- Marsupella profunda, the Western rustwort, a liverwort species endemic to Europe
- Murexsul profunda, a sea snail species

== See also ==
- Profunda (disambiguation)
