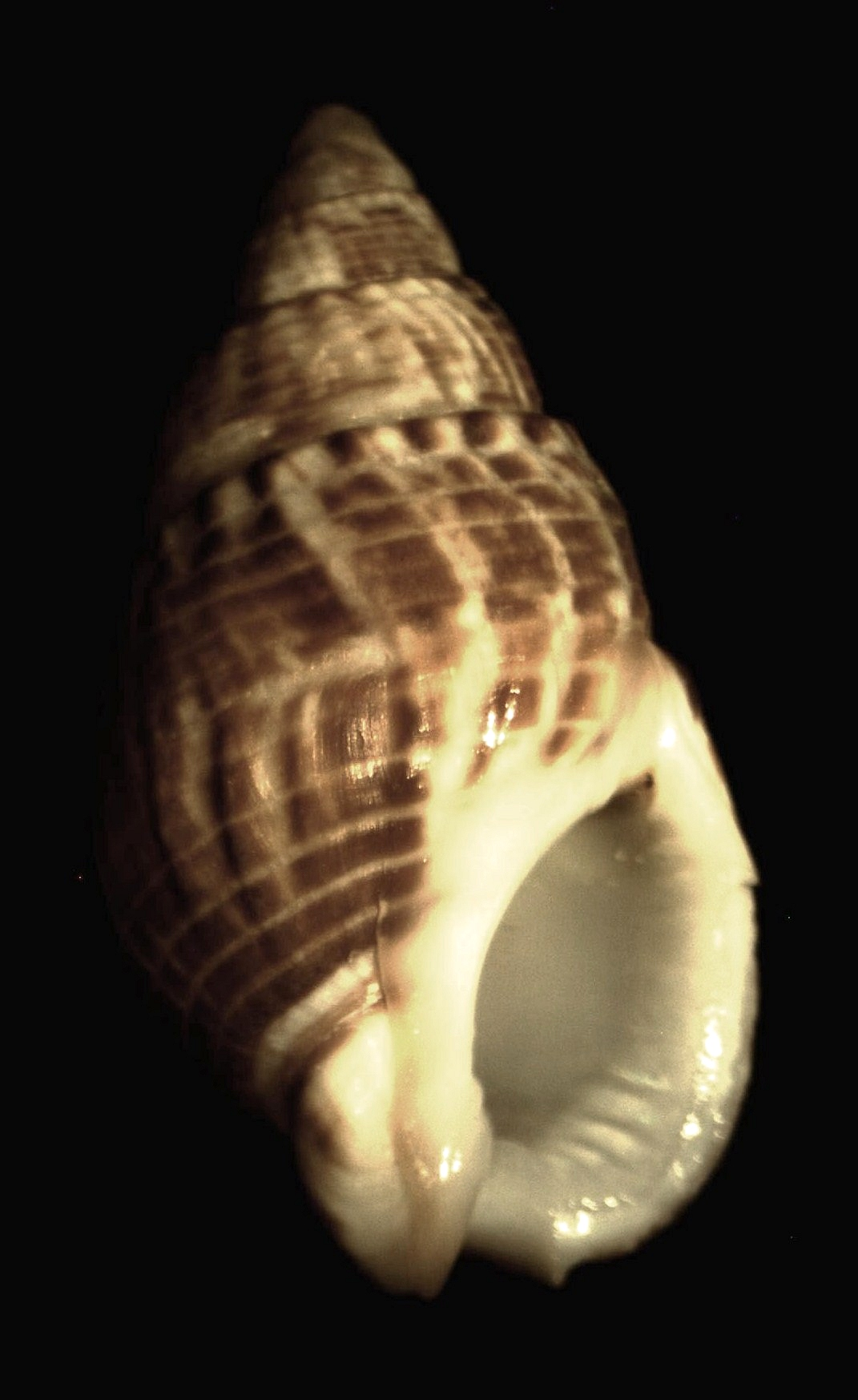
- Apertural view of a shell of Nassarius gayii

Scientific classification
- Kingdom: Animalia
- Phylum: Mollusca
- Class: Gastropoda
- Subclass: Caenogastropoda
- Order: Neogastropoda
- Family: Nassariidae
- Genus: Nassarius
- Species: N. gayii

Binomial name
- Nassarius gayii (Kiener, 1834)

Synonyms
- Buccinum gayii Kiener, 1834 (original combination); Buccinum taeniolatum Philippi, 1845 (uncertain synonym); Nassa flammulata Preston, 1909; Nassa nevilliana Preston, 1906; Nassa rubricata Gould, 1850; Nassarius taeniolatus (Philippi, 1845)

= Nassarius gayii =

Species of gastropod

Nassarius gayii is a species of sea snail, a marine gastropod mollusc in the family Nassariidae, the Nassa mud snails or dog whelks.

== Description ==
The length of the shell varies between 14 mm and 17 mm.

The small, pretty thick shell is elongated and conical. It is formed of six distinct, slightly convex whorls. The surface of the upper whorls appears to be shagreened by very small tubercles, formed by a multitude of very approximate longitudinal folds and transverse striae. Upon the lowest whorls the longitudinal folds disappear, and the transverse striae, on the contrary, become more apparent. The simple suture is accompanied by a small, very narrow scaffolding, formed by a row of granulations, a little larger, and like papillae. The whitish aperture is subrotund. The outer lip is smooth at its edge, and striated internally. The columella is arcuated and smooth. The general color of this shell is of a uniform red brown.

== Distribution ==
This species occurs in the Pacific Ocean from Peru to the Strait of Magellan
