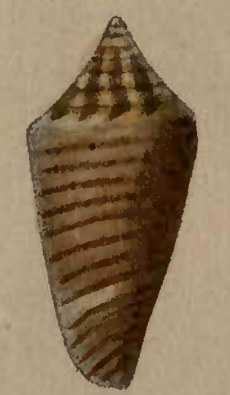
- Drawing of a shell of Conus largilliertii

Scientific classification
- Domain: Eukaryota
- Kingdom: Animalia
- Phylum: Mollusca
- Class: Gastropoda
- Subclass: Caenogastropoda
- Order: Neogastropoda
- Superfamily: Conoidea
- Family: Conidae
- Genus: Conus
- Species: C. largilliertii

Binomial name
- Conus largilliertii Kiener, 1847

Synonyms
- Conasprella largilliertii Kiener, 1847; Conus (Dauciconus) largilliertii Kiener, 1847 · accepted, alternate representation; Gradiconus largilliertii (Kiener, 1847)

= Conus largilliertii =

Species of sea snail

Conus largilliertii, common name Largilliert's cone, is a species of sea snail, a marine gastropod mollusk in the family Conidae, the cone snails, cone shells or cones.

These snails are predatory and venomous. They are capable of stinging humans.

== Description ==
The size of the shell varies between 30 mm and 60 mm. The spire is rather elevated and is maculated. Its color is light chestnut, with darker revolving lines of spots, and usually a white central band.

== Distribution ==
This marine species occurs in the Caribbean Sea and the Gulf of Mexico from Florida to Mexico; in the Atlantic Ocean off South Carolina, USA.
