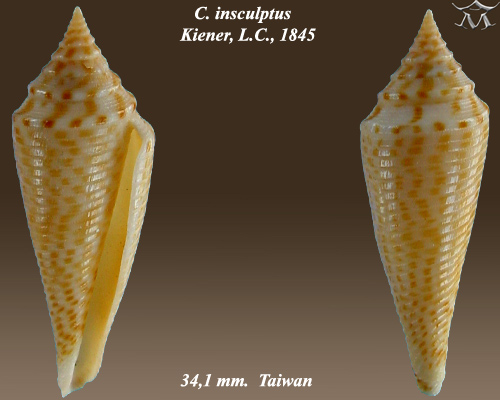
- Apertural and abapertural views of shell of Conasprella insculpta Kiener, L.C., 1845

Conservation status
- Least Concern (IUCN 3.1)

Scientific classification
- Kingdom: Animalia
- Phylum: Mollusca
- Class: Gastropoda
- Subclass: Caenogastropoda
- Order: Neogastropoda
- Superfamily: Conoidea
- Family: Conidae
- Genus: Conasprella
- Species: C. insculpta

Binomial name
- Conasprella insculpta (Kiener, 1847)

Synonyms
- Bathyconus hypochlorus (Tomlin, 1937); Bathyconus insculptus (Kiener, 1847); Conasprella (Fusiconus) hypochlorus (Tomlin, 1937); Conasprella (Fusiconus) insculpta (Kiener, 1847) · accepted, alternate representation; Conasprella hypochlorus (Tomlin, 1937); Conus croceus E. A. Smith, 1877 (invalid: junior homonym of Conus croceus G.B. Sowerby I, 1833; C. hypochlorus is a replacement name); Conus hypochlorus Tomlin, 1937; Conus insculptus Kiener, 1847 (original combination); Fusiconus (Fusiconus) insculptus (Kiener, 1847)

= Conasprella insculpta =

Species of gastropod

Conasprella insculpta, common name the engraved cone, is a species of sea snail, a marine gastropod mollusk in the family Conidae, the cone snails and their allies.

Like all species within the genus Conasprella, these cone snails are predatory and venomous. They are capable of stinging humans, therefore live ones should be handled carefully or not at all.

== Description ==
The size of the shell varies between 18 mm and 66 mm.

== Distribution ==
This marine species occurs off Western Thailand; Fiji, Papua New Guinea, the Philippines, the South China Sea, Taiwan, and off the Northern Territory, Australia.
