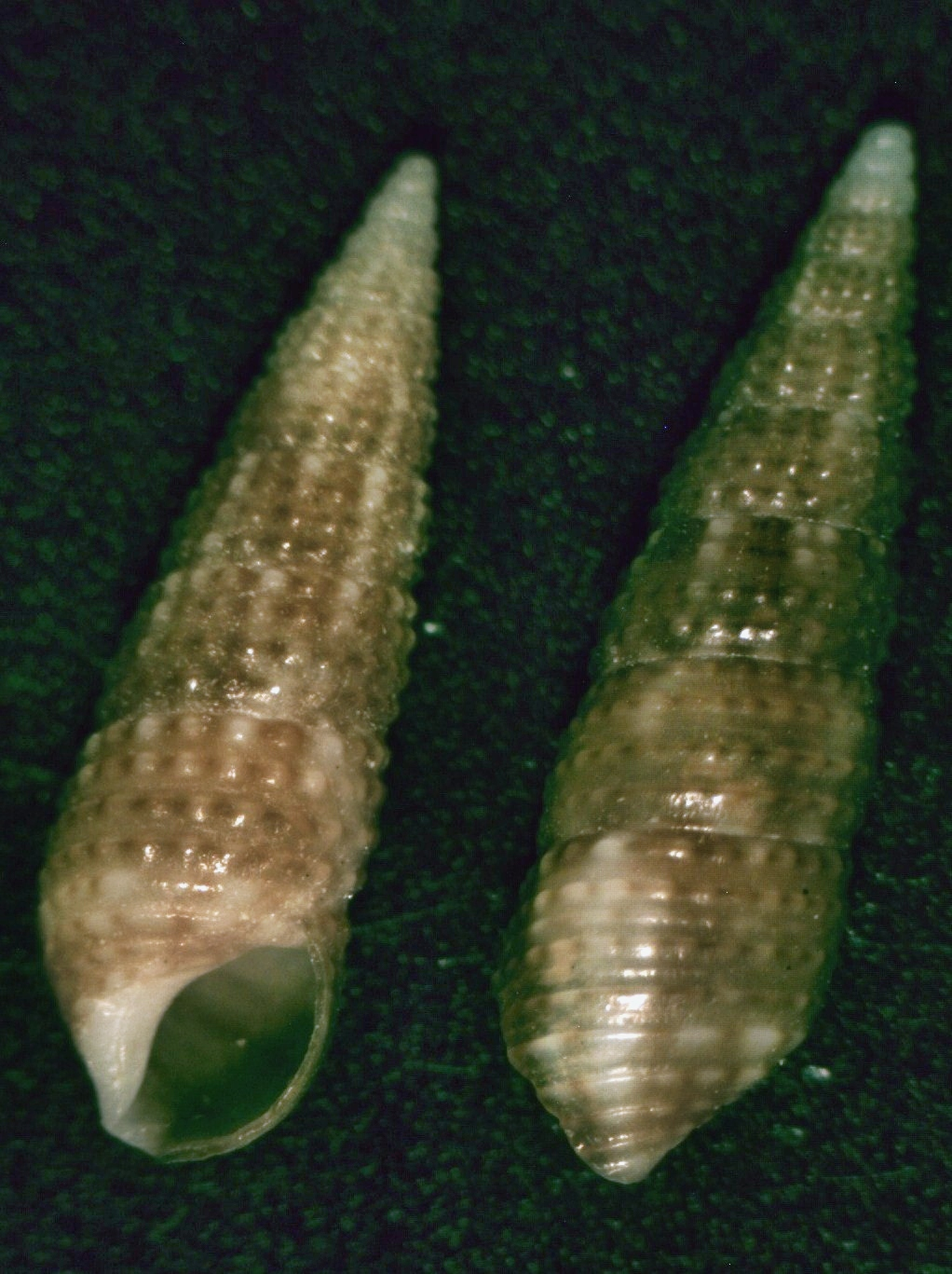

Scientific classification
- Kingdom: Animalia
- Phylum: Mollusca
- Class: Gastropoda
- Subclass: Caenogastropoda
- Order: incertae sedis
- Family: Cerithiidae
- Genus: Cacozeliana
- Species: C. granarium

Binomial name
- Cacozeliana granarium (Kiener, 1842)

Synonyms
- Bittium granarium (Kiener, 1842); Cacozeliana granaria; Cerithium granarium Kiener, 1842; Cerithium lacertinum Gould, 1861

= Cacozeliana granarium =

Species of gastropod

Cacozeliana granarium is a species of sea snail, a marine gastropod mollusk in the family Cerithiidae.

== Distribution ==
This species occurs in the Indian Ocean off Madagascar.

This species is native to Australia with known distributions in Western Australia, South Australia, Victoria, Tasmania, New South Wales, and Queensland.
