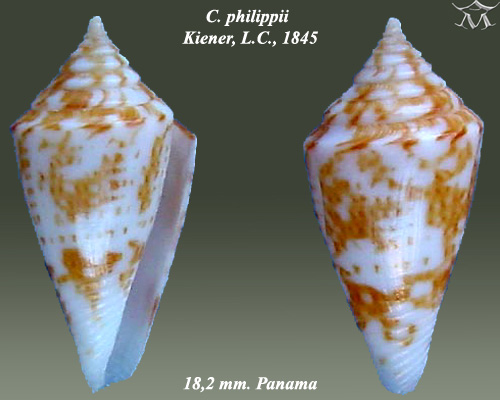
- Apertural and abapertural views of shell of Conus philippii Kiener, L.C., 1845
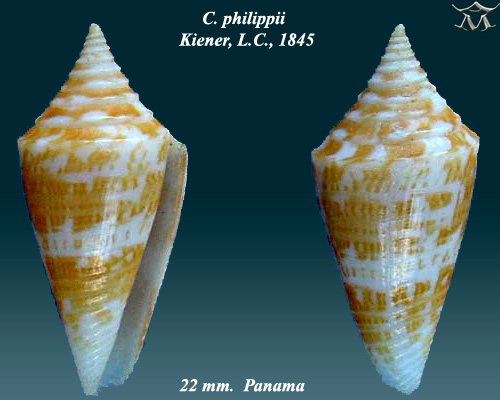

Scientific classification
- Domain: Eukaryota
- Kingdom: Animalia
- Phylum: Mollusca
- Class: Gastropoda
- Subclass: Caenogastropoda
- Order: Neogastropoda
- Superfamily: Conoidea
- Family: Conidae
- Genus: Conus
- Species: C. philippii

Binomial name
- Conus philippii Kiener, 1847

Synonyms
- Conus (Dauciconus) philippii Kiener, 1847 · accepted, alternate representation; Conus candidus Kiener, 1845 (invalid: junior homonym of Conus candidus Born, 1778); Conus commodus A. Adams, 1855 (nomen dubium); Conus optabilis A. Adams, 1855 (nomen dubium); Conus tenuisulcatus G. B. Sowerby II, 1870 (nomen dubium); Gradiconus philippii (Kiener, 1847)

= Conus philippii =

Species of sea snail

Conus philippii, common name Philppi's cone, is a species of sea snail, a marine gastropod mollusk in the family Conidae, the cone snails and their allies.

Like all species within the genus Conus, these snails are predatory and venomous. They are capable of stinging humans, therefore live ones should be handled carefully or not at all.

== Distribution ==
This species occurs in the Caribbean Sea.

== Description ==
The maximum recorded shell length is 36 mm.

== Habitat ==
Minimum recorded depth is 65 m. Maximum recorded depth is 65 m.
