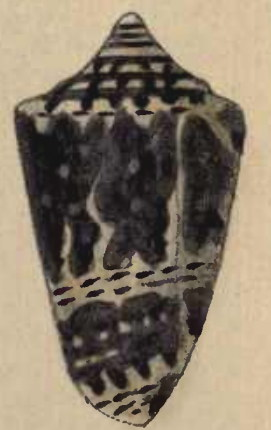
- Drawing of a shell of Conus sanguineus

Scientific classification
- Domain: Eukaryota
- Kingdom: Animalia
- Phylum: Mollusca
- Class: Gastropoda
- Subclass: Caenogastropoda
- Order: Neogastropoda
- Superfamily: Conoidea
- Family: Conidae
- Genus: Conus
- Species: C. sanguineus

Binomial name
- Conus sanguineus Kiener, 1850

Synonyms
- Conus (Stephanoconus) sanguineus Kiener, 1850 · accepted, alternate representation; Tenorioconus sanguineus (Kiener, 1850)

= Conus sanguineus =

Species of sea snail

Conus sanguineus is a species of sea snail, a marine gastropod mollusk in the family Conidae, the cone snails, cone shells or cones.

These snails are predatory and venomous. They are capable of stinging humans. Commonly, they are known as cone snails.

== Description ==
The size of the shell varies between 38 mm and 78 mm. The spire is concavely elevated, not coronated. The body whorl is smooth, slightly striate below. It is irregularly marbled with chestnut and white, with equidistant chestnut revolving lines bearing white, granularly elevated spots.

== Distribution ==
This marine species occurs off the Lesser Antilles and from the Bahamas to Venezuela

== Interactions with Humans ==
Cone snails are typically not aggressive, so when humans are stung by them it's usually due to handling the snails. Cone snails have a small dagger like tooth that injects their prey with a "rapid-acting venom". Mild stings feel similar to a bee sting with a burning or stinging sensation. Other symptoms include "fainting..., itching, loss of coordination, heart failure, difficulty speaking, difficulty breathing, and double vision. Some stings can cause more severe symptoms such as cyanosis, numbness in the limbs, paralysis, coma or even death. Symptoms may appear just a few minutes after a sting or possibly days after.
