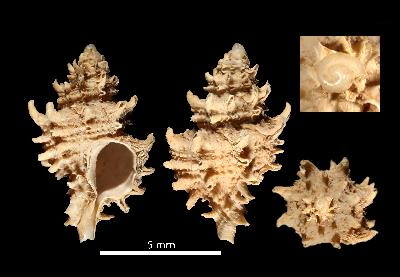
- Shell of Murexsul valae (paratype in MNHN, Paris)

Scientific classification
- Kingdom: Animalia
- Phylum: Mollusca
- Class: Gastropoda
- Subclass: Caenogastropoda
- Order: Neogastropoda
- Family: Muricidae
- Genus: Murexsul
- Species: M. valae

Binomial name
- Murexsul valae (Houart, 1991)

Synonyms
- Muricopsis (Murexsul) valae Houart, 1991

= Murexsul valae =

Species of gastropod

Murexsul valae is a species of sea snail, a marine gastropod mollusk in the family Muricidae, the murex snails or rock snails.

== Distribution ==
This marine species occurs off Transkei, South Africa.
