= Cacozeliana icarus =

Scientific classification
- Kingdom: Animalia
- Phylum: Mollusca
- Class: Gastropoda
- Subclass: Caenogastropoda
- Order: incertae sedis
- Family: Cerithiidae
- Genus: Cacozeliana
- Species: C. icarus

Binomial name
- Cacozeliana icarus (Bayle, 1880)

Synonyms
- Bittium icarus (Bayle, 1880); Cerithium icarus Bayle, 1880

Species of gastropod

Cacozeliana icarus is a species of sea snail, a marine gastropod mollusk in the family Cerithiidae.
