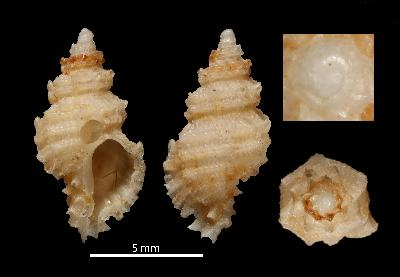
- Shell of Murexsul diamantinus (paratype in the MNHN, Paris)

Scientific classification
- Kingdom: Animalia
- Phylum: Mollusca
- Class: Gastropoda
- Subclass: Caenogastropoda
- Order: Neogastropoda
- Family: Muricidae
- Genus: Murexsul
- Species: M. diamantinus

Binomial name
- Murexsul diamantinus (Houart, 1991)

Synonyms
- Muricopsis (Murexsul) diamantina Houart, 1991

= Murexsul diamantinus =

Species of gastropod

Murexsul diamantinus is a species of sea snail, a marine gastropod mollusk in the family Muricidae, the murex snails or rock snails.
