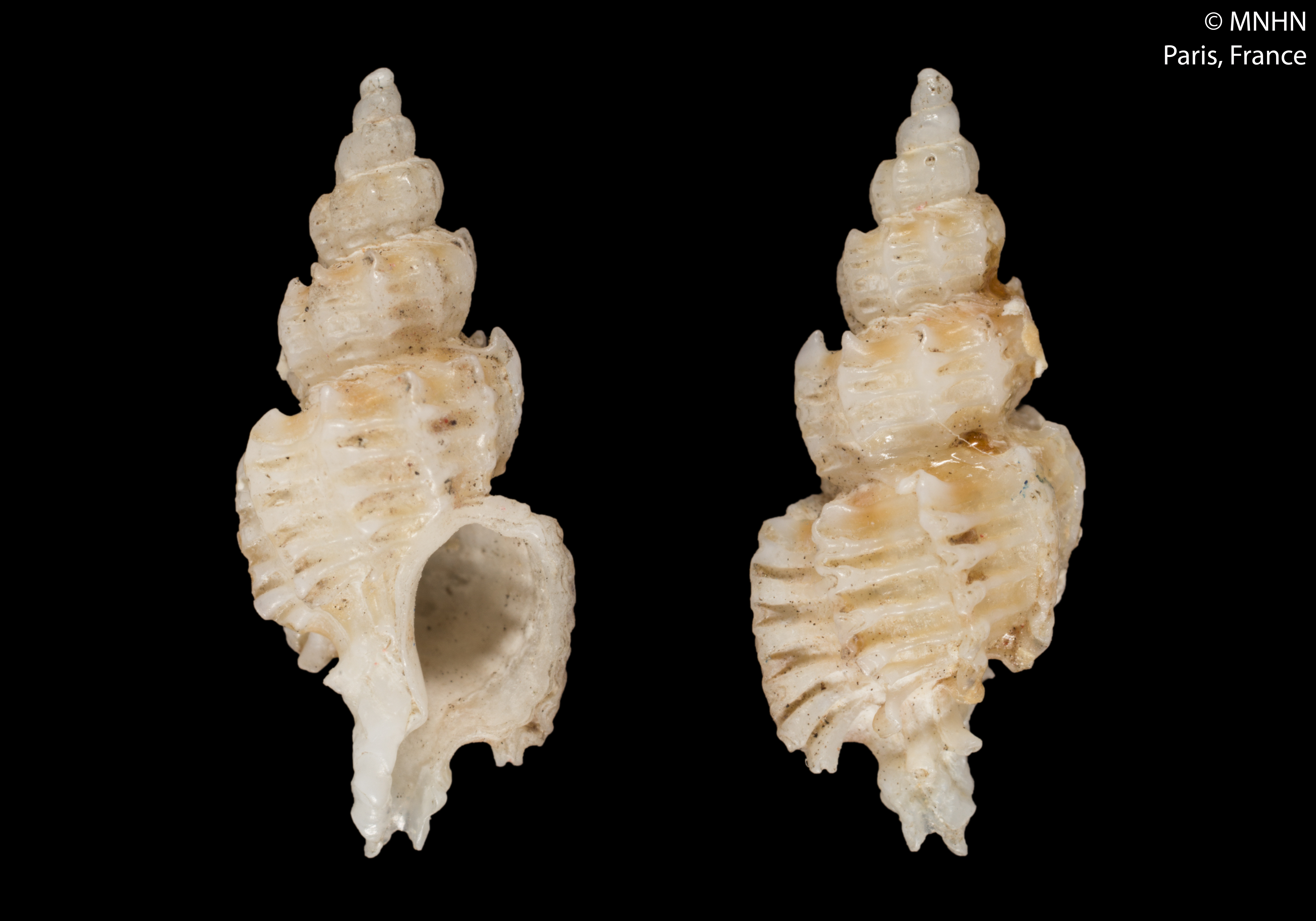
- Shell of Murexsul kieneri (syntype at MNHN, Paris)

Scientific classification
- Kingdom: Animalia
- Phylum: Mollusca
- Class: Gastropoda
- Subclass: Caenogastropoda
- Order: Neogastropoda
- Family: Muricidae
- Genus: Murexsul
- Species: M. kieneri

Binomial name
- Murexsul kieneri (Reeve, 1845)

Synonyms
- Murex exiguus Kiener, 1842 (Invalid: junior homonym of Murex exiguus Broderip, 1833; Murex kieneri is a replacement name); Murex kieneri Reeve, 1845

= Murexsul kieneri =

Species of gastropod

Murexsul kieneri is a species of sea snail, a marine gastropod mollusk in the family Muricidae, the murex snails or rock snails.
