= Murexsul jacquelinae =

Scientific classification
- Kingdom: Animalia
- Phylum: Mollusca
- Class: Gastropoda
- Subclass: Caenogastropoda
- Order: Neogastropoda
- Family: Muricidae
- Genus: Murexsul
- Species: M. jacquelinae

Binomial name
- Murexsul jacquelinae Emerson & D'Attilio, 1969

Species of gastropod

Murexsul jacquelinae is a species of sea snail, a marine gastropod mollusc in the family Muricidae, the murex snails or rock snails.
