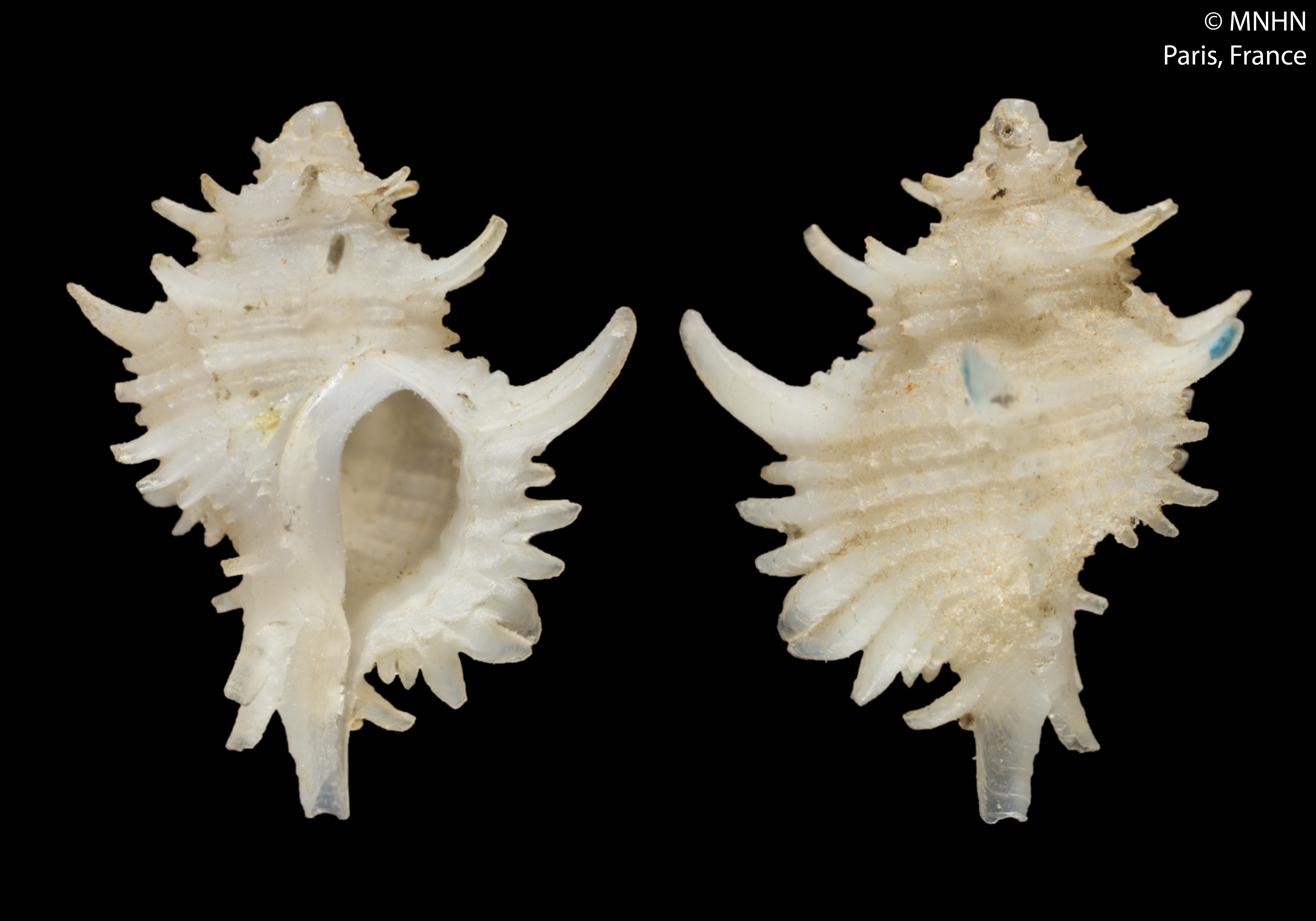
- Shell of Murexsul metivieri (holotype at MNHN, Paris)

Scientific classification
- Kingdom: Animalia
- Phylum: Mollusca
- Class: Gastropoda
- Subclass: Caenogastropoda
- Order: Neogastropoda
- Family: Muricidae
- Genus: Murexsul
- Species: M. metivieri

Binomial name
- Murexsul metivieri (Houart, 1988)

Synonyms
- Muricopsis (Murexsul) metivieri Houart, 1988

= Murexsul metivieri =

Species of gastropod

Murexsul metivieri is a species of sea snail, a marine gastropod mollusk in the family Muricidae, the murex snails or rock snails.

== Distribution ==
This marine species occurs in the Coral Sea.
