= Murexsul tulensis =

Scientific classification
- Kingdom: Animalia
- Phylum: Mollusca
- Class: Gastropoda
- Subclass: Caenogastropoda
- Order: Neogastropoda
- Family: Muricidae
- Genus: Murexsul
- Species: M. tulensis

Binomial name
- Murexsul tulensis (Radwin & D'Attilio, 1976)

Synonyms
- Muricopsis tulensis Radwin & D'Attilio, 1976

Species of gastropod

Murexsul tulensis is a species of sea snail, a marine gastropod mollusk in the family Muricidae, the murex snails or rock snails.
