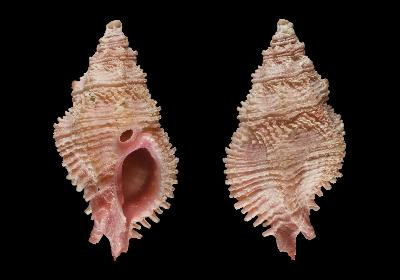
- Shell of Murexsul spiculus (paratype in the MNHN, Paris)

Scientific classification
- Kingdom: Animalia
- Phylum: Mollusca
- Class: Gastropoda
- Subclass: Caenogastropoda
- Order: Neogastropoda
- Family: Muricidae
- Genus: Murexsul
- Species: M. spiculus

Binomial name
- Murexsul spiculus (Houart, 1987)

Synonyms
- Muricopsis spiculus Houart, 1987

= Murexsul spiculus =

Species of gastropod

Murexsul spiculus is a species of sea snail, a marine gastropod mollusk in the family Muricidae, the murex snails or rock snails.

== Description ==
The length of the shell attains 10.2 mm.

== Distribution ==
This species occurs in the Coral Sea .
