= Murexsul zonatus =

Scientific classification
- Kingdom: Animalia
- Phylum: Mollusca
- Class: Gastropoda
- Subclass: Caenogastropoda
- Order: Neogastropoda
- Family: Muricidae
- Genus: Murexsul
- Species: M. zonatus

Binomial name
- Murexsul zonatus Hayashi & Habe, 1965

Species of gastropod

Murexsul zonatus is a species of sea snail, a marine gastropod mollusk in the family Muricidae, the murex snails or rock snails.
