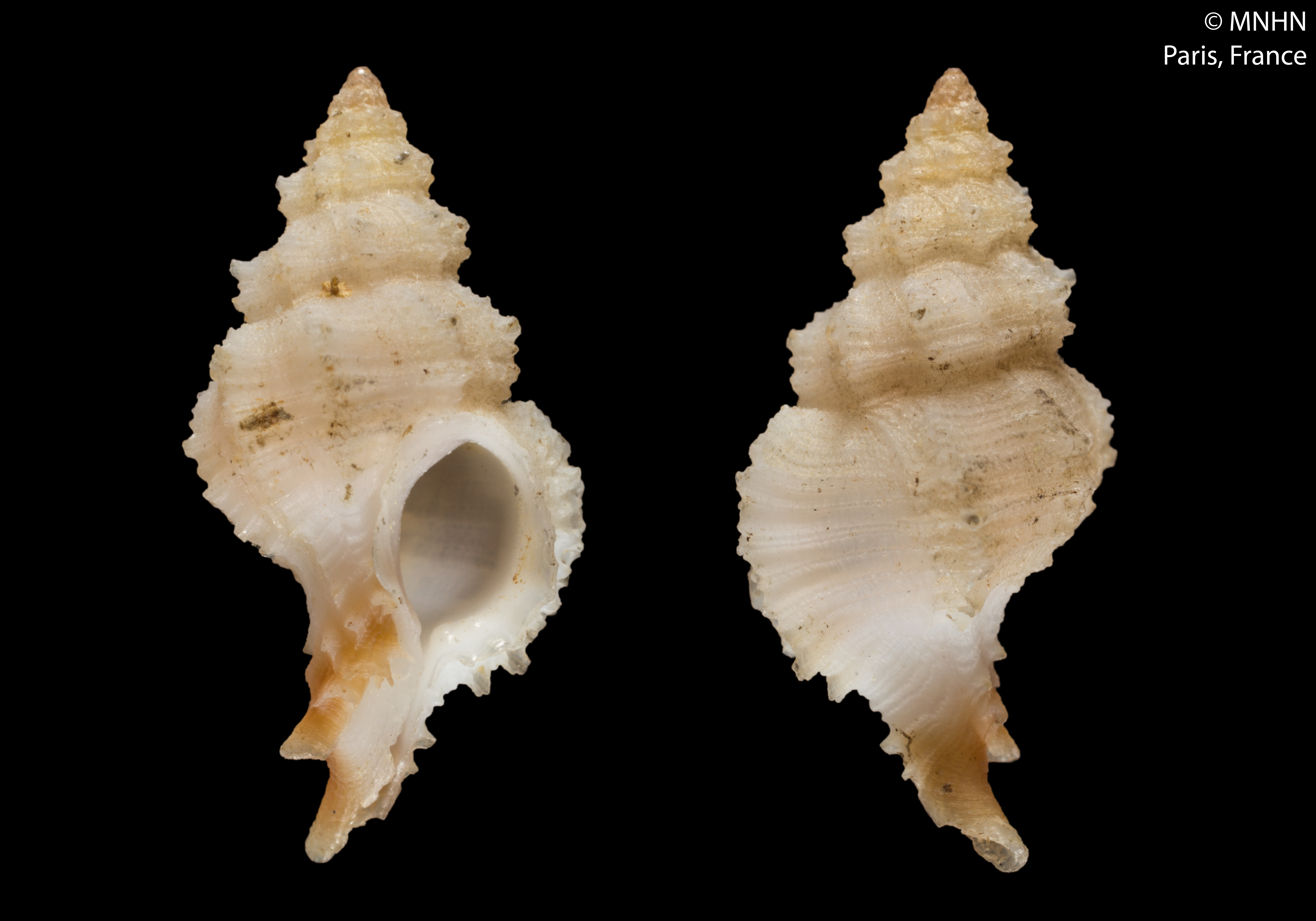
- Shell of Murexsul merlei (holotype at MNHN, Paris)

Scientific classification
- Kingdom: Animalia
- Phylum: Mollusca
- Class: Gastropoda
- Subclass: Caenogastropoda
- Order: Neogastropoda
- Family: Muricidae
- Genus: Murexsul
- Species: M. merlei

Binomial name
- Murexsul merlei Houart & Héros, 2008

= Murexsul merlei =

Species of gastropod

Murexsul merlei is a species of sea snail, a marine gastropod mollusk in the family Muricidae, the murex snails or rock snails. It was first described by Roland Houart and V. Héros in the 2008 publication Muricidae (Mollusca: Gastropoda) from Fiji and Tonga. It can be found from depths of 268 metres (879 ft) to 806 metres (2,644 ft).

== Distribution ==
This marine species occurs in the Tonga Islands.
