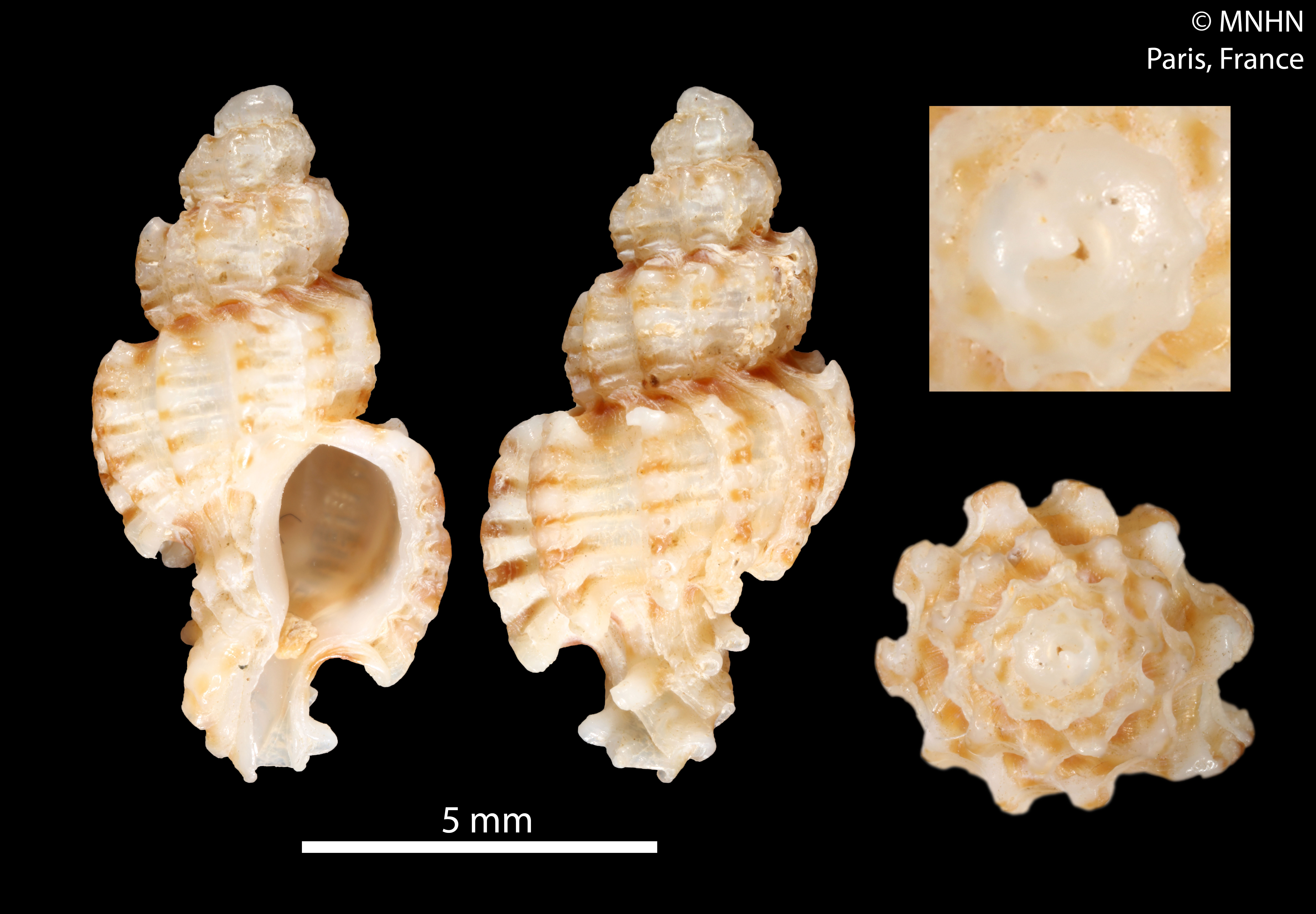
- Shell of Murexsul nothokieneri (paratype at MNHN, Paris)

Scientific classification
- Kingdom: Animalia
- Phylum: Mollusca
- Class: Gastropoda
- Subclass: Caenogastropoda
- Order: Neogastropoda
- Family: Muricidae
- Genus: Murexsul
- Species: M. nothokieneri

Binomial name
- Murexsul nothokieneri Vokes, 1978

Synonyms
- Muricopsis nothokieneri (E. H. Vokes, 1978)

= Murexsul nothokieneri =

Species of gastropod

Murexsul nothokieneri is a species of sea snail, a marine gastropod mollusk in the family Muricidae, the murex snails or rock snails.

== Distribution ==
This marine species occurs off East London, Cape Province, South Africa.
