= Murexsul elatensis =

Scientific classification
- Kingdom: Animalia
- Phylum: Mollusca
- Class: Gastropoda
- Subclass: Caenogastropoda
- Order: Neogastropoda
- Family: Muricidae
- Genus: Murexsul
- Species: M. elatensis

Binomial name
- Murexsul elatensis (Emerson & D'Attilio, 1979)

Synonyms
- Favartia elatensis Emerson & D'Attilio, 1979

Species of gastropod

Murexsul elatensis is a species of sea snail, a marine gastropod mollusk in the family Muricidae, the murex snails or rock snails.
