= Murexsul harasewychi =

Scientific classification
- Kingdom: Animalia
- Phylum: Mollusca
- Class: Gastropoda
- Subclass: Caenogastropoda
- Order: Neogastropoda
- Family: Muricidae
- Genus: Murexsul
- Species: M. harasewychi

Binomial name
- Murexsul harasewychi Petuch, 1987

Species of gastropod

Murexsul harasewychi is a species of sea snail, a marine gastropod mollusk in the family Muricidae, the murex snails or rock snails.

== Description ==
Original description: "Shell small for genus, thin, fragile, very elongated and fusiform, with high elevated spire; siphonal canal long, roughly one-third total length; 6 varices per whorl; shoulder sharply angled; body whorl sculptured with 5 large fimbriated cords; area between suture and shoulder without large cords but with numerous fine spiral threads; shoulder of each varix with 1 small, bifurcated spine; 5 spiral cords overlap onto varices, producing low, fimbriated knobs; varices on siphonal canal with 2 short spines; aperture round-oval, with raised peristome; inner edge of lip without denticles; shell color two-toned, with body whorl and spire being yellow-orange and with siphonal canal being brown; early whorls, protoconch, and tips of shoulder spines pale reddish-brown; interior of aperture and peristome white."

== Distribution ==
Locus typicus: "Off Cabo La Vela, Goajira Peninsula, Colombia."
