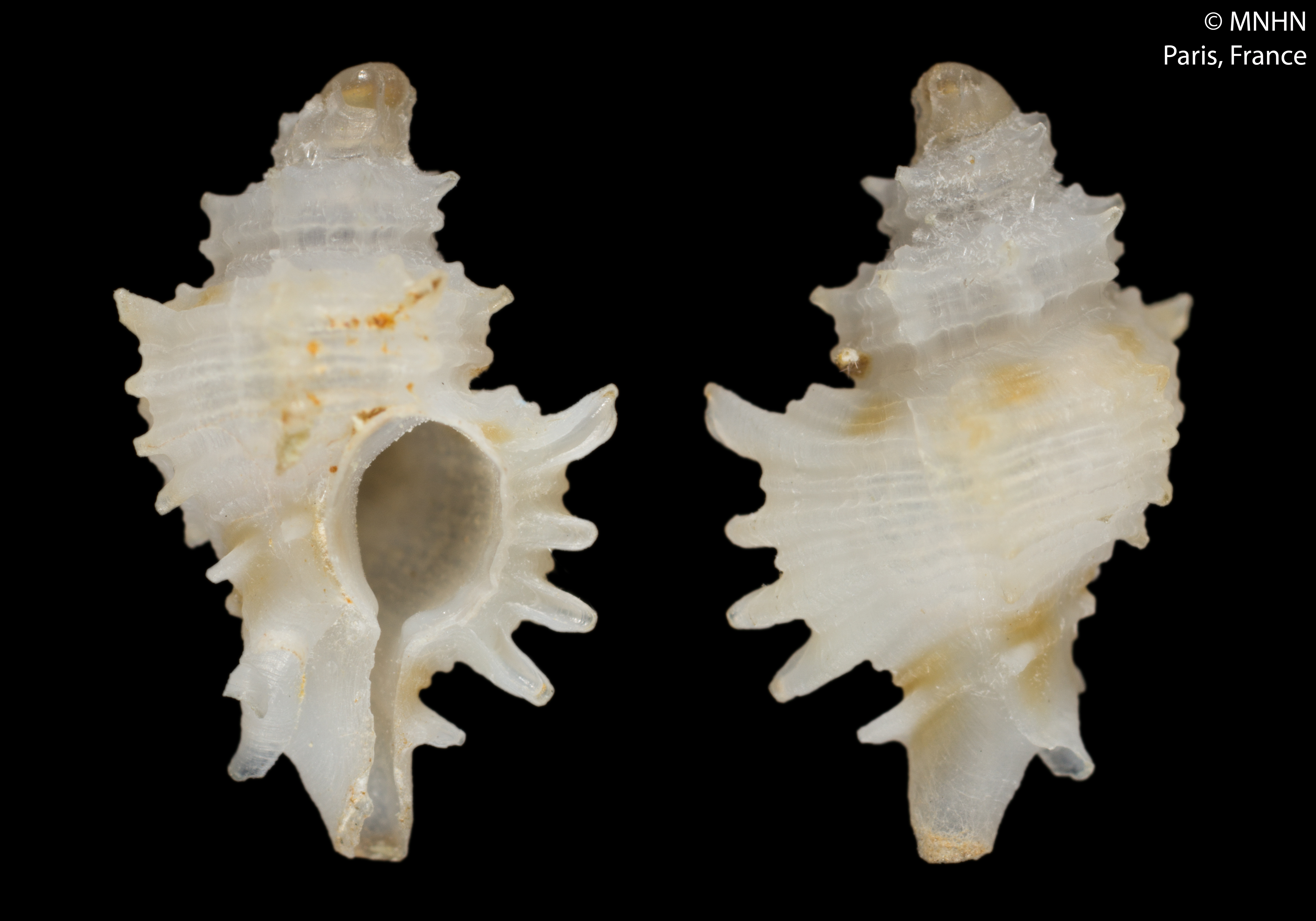
- Shell of Murexsul charcoti (holotype at MNHN, Paris)

Scientific classification
- Kingdom: Animalia
- Phylum: Mollusca
- Class: Gastropoda
- Subclass: Caenogastropoda
- Order: Neogastropoda
- Family: Muricidae
- Genus: Murexsul
- Species: M. charcoti

Binomial name
- Murexsul charcoti (Houart, 1991)

Synonyms
- Muricopsis (Murexsul) charcoti Houart, 1991

= Murexsul charcoti =

Species of gastropod

Murexsul charcoti is a species of sea snail, a marine gastropod mollusk in the family Muricidae, the murex snails or rock snails.

== Distribution ==
This marine species occurs off New Caledonia.
