= Murexsul armatus =

Scientific classification
- Kingdom: Animalia
- Phylum: Mollusca
- Class: Gastropoda
- Subclass: Caenogastropoda
- Order: Neogastropoda
- Family: Muricidae
- Genus: Murexsul
- Species: M. armatus

Binomial name
- Murexsul armatus (A. Adams, 1854)

Synonyms
- Murex armatus A. Adams, 1854; Muricidea dubius var. squamulatus Carpenter, 1866b

Species of gastropod

Murexsul armatus is a species of sea snail, a marine gastropod mollusk in the family Muricidae, the murex snails or rock snails.
