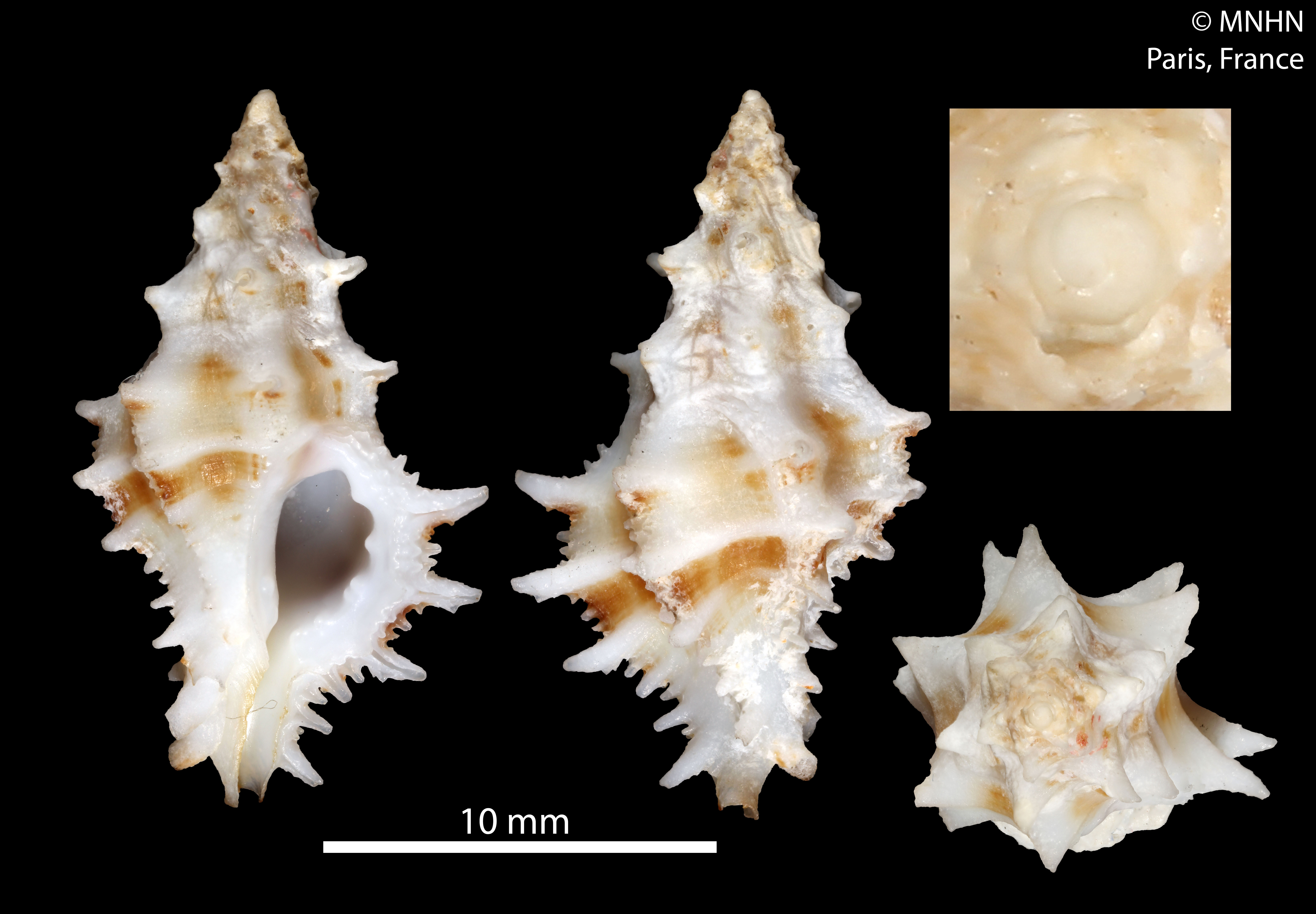
- Shell of Murexsul chesleri (paratype at MNHN, Paris)

Scientific classification
- Kingdom: Animalia
- Phylum: Mollusca
- Class: Gastropoda
- Subclass: Caenogastropoda
- Order: Neogastropoda
- Family: Muricidae
- Genus: Murexsul
- Species: M. chesleri

Binomial name
- Murexsul chesleri Houart, 2006

= Murexsul chesleri =

Species of gastropod

Murexsul chesleri is a species of sea snail, a marine gastropod mollusk in the family Muricidae, the murex snails or rock snails.

== Distribution ==
This marine species occurs off Honduras.
