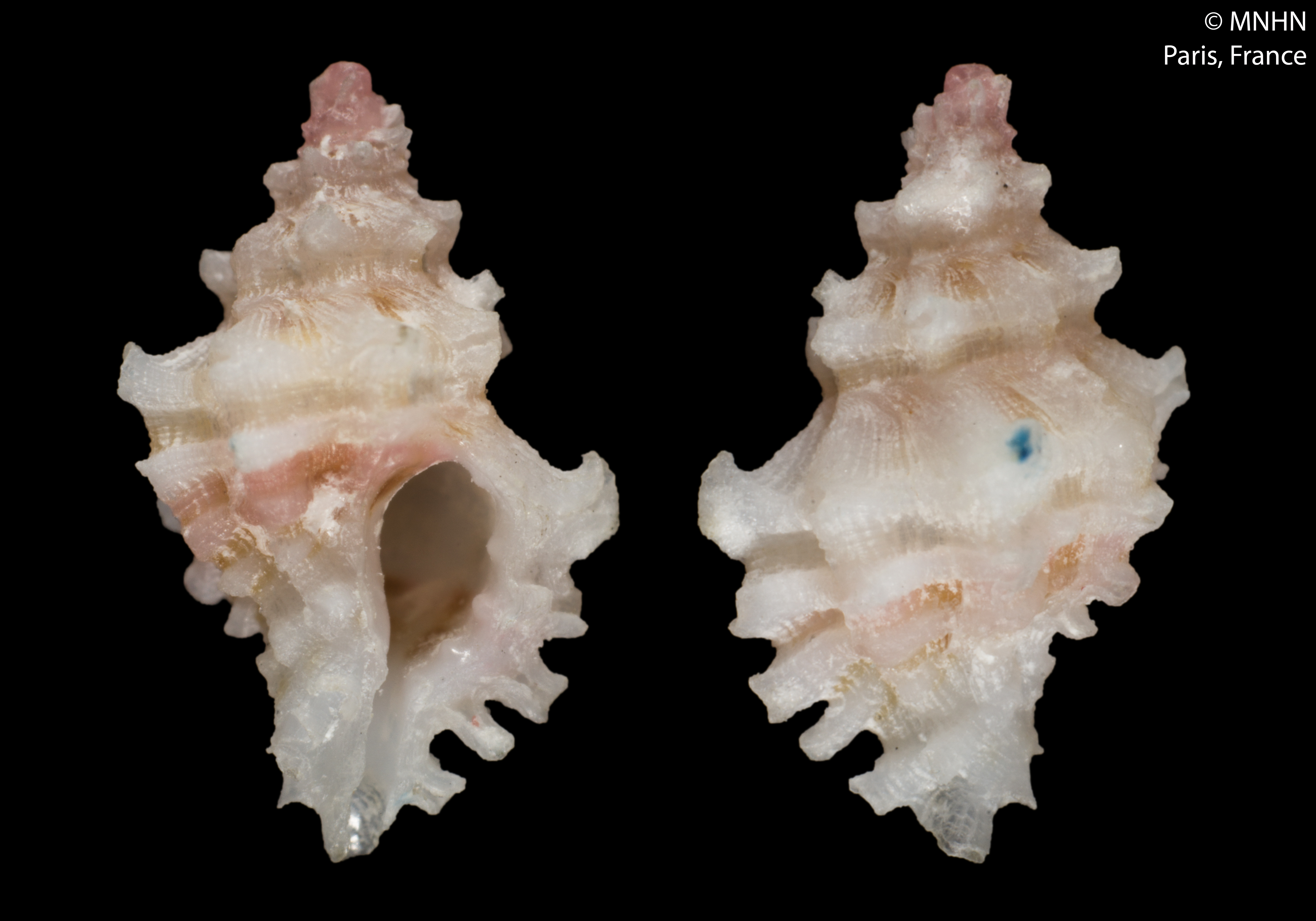
- Shell of Murexsul leonardi (holotype at MNHN, Paris)

Scientific classification
- Kingdom: Animalia
- Phylum: Mollusca
- Class: Gastropoda
- Subclass: Caenogastropoda
- Order: Neogastropoda
- Family: Muricidae
- Genus: Murexsul
- Species: M. leonardi

Binomial name
- Murexsul leonardi (Houart, 1993)

Synonyms
- Muricopsis (Murexsul) leonardi Houart, 1993b

= Murexsul leonardi =

Species of gastropod

Murexsul leonardi is a species of sea snail, a marine gastropod mollusk in the family Muricidae, the murex snails or rock snails.

== Distribution ==
This marine species occurs off Christmas Island.
