= Murexsul zylmanae =

Scientific classification
- Kingdom: Animalia
- Phylum: Mollusca
- Class: Gastropoda
- Subclass: Caenogastropoda
- Order: Neogastropoda
- Family: Muricidae
- Genus: Murexsul
- Species: M. zylmanae

Binomial name
- Murexsul zylmanae (Petuch, 1993)

Synonyms
- Muricopsis zylmanae Petuch, 1993

Species of gastropod

Murexsul zylmanae is a species of sea snail, a marine gastropod mollusk in the family Muricidae. More common names are murex snails or rock snails.
