= Cacozeliana fuscocapitulum =

Scientific classification
- Kingdom: Animalia
- Phylum: Mollusca
- Class: Gastropoda
- Subclass: Caenogastropoda
- Order: incertae sedis
- Family: Cerithiidae
- Genus: Cacozeliana
- Species: C. fuscocapitulum

Binomial name
- Cacozeliana fuscocapitulum (Hedley & Petterd, 1906)

Synonyms
- Bittium fuscocapitulum Hedley & Petterd, 1906

Species of gastropod

Cacozeliana fuscocapitulum is a species of sea snail, a marine gastropod mollusk in the family Cerithiidae.
