= Cacozeliana variegata =

Scientific classification
- Kingdom: Animalia
- Phylum: Mollusca
- Class: Gastropoda
- Subclass: Caenogastropoda
- Order: incertae sedis
- Family: Cerithiidae
- Genus: Cacozeliana
- Species: C. variegata

Binomial name
- Cacozeliana variegata (Henn & Brazier, 1894)

Synonyms
- Bittium variegatum Henn & Brazier, 1894

Species of gastropod

Cacozeliana variegata is a species of sea snail, a marine gastropod mollusk in the family Cerithiidae.
