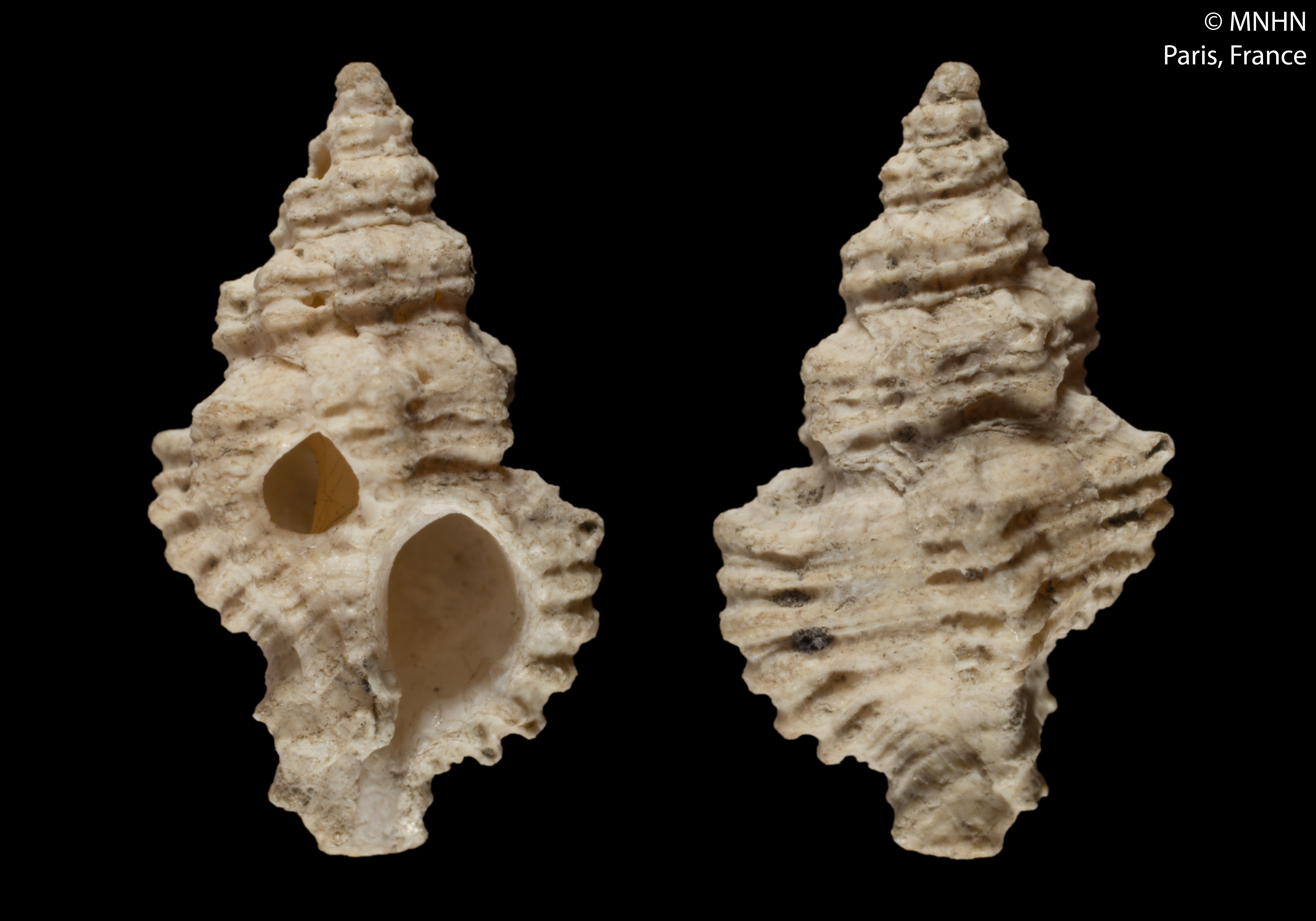
- Shell of Murexsul reunionensis (paratype at MNHN, Paris)

Scientific classification
- Kingdom: Animalia
- Phylum: Mollusca
- Class: Gastropoda
- Subclass: Caenogastropoda
- Order: Neogastropoda
- Family: Muricidae
- Genus: Murexsul
- Species: M. reunionensis

Binomial name
- Murexsul reunionensis Houart, 1985

= Murexsul reunionensis =

Species of gastropod

Murexsul reunionensis is a species of sea snail, a marine gastropod mollusk in the family Muricidae, the murex snails or rock snails.

== Distribution ==
This marine species occurs off Réunion.
