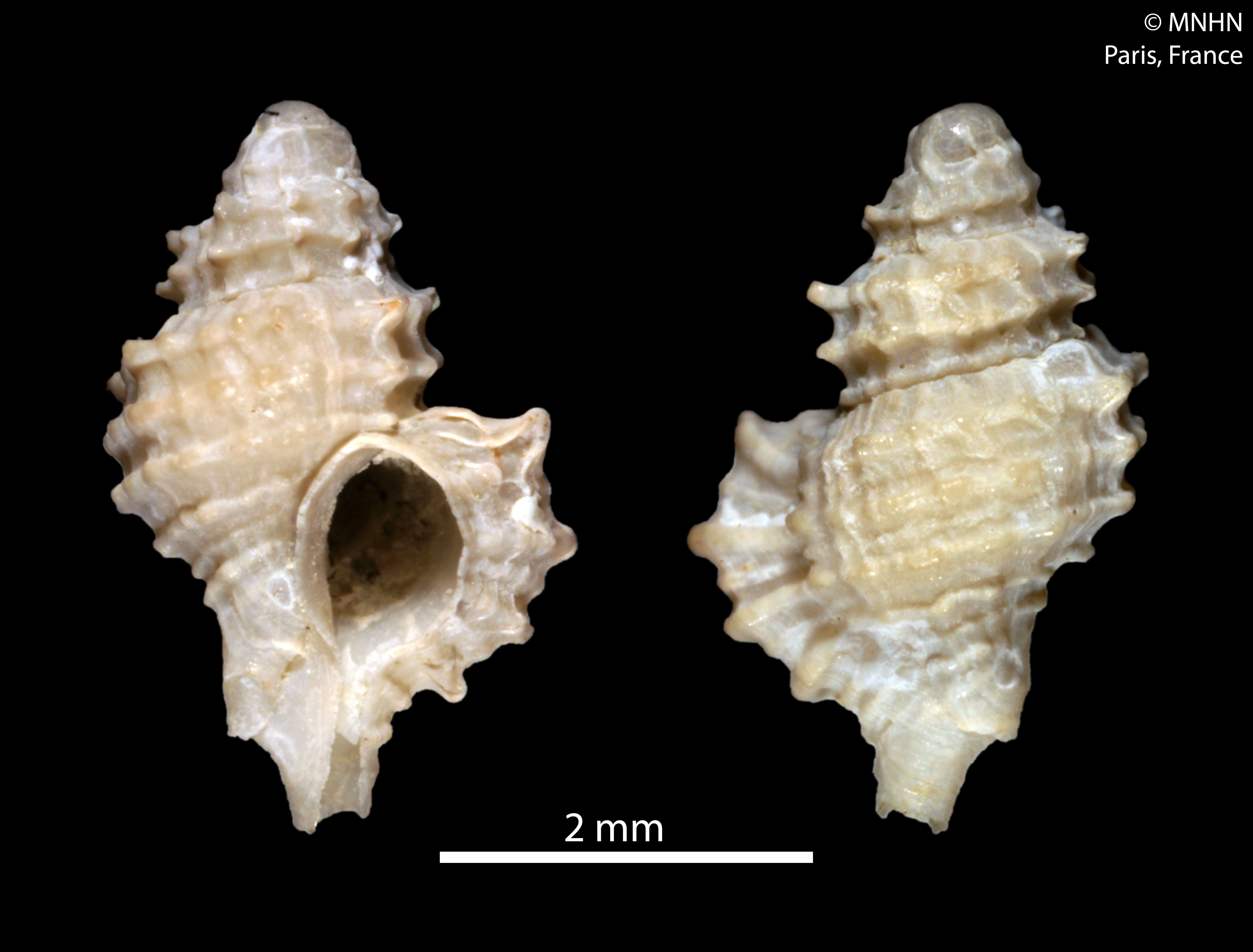
- Shell of Murexsul queenslandicus (paratype at MNHN, Paris)

Scientific classification
- Kingdom: Animalia
- Phylum: Mollusca
- Class: Gastropoda
- Subclass: Caenogastropoda
- Order: Neogastropoda
- Family: Muricidae
- Genus: Murexsul
- Species: M. queenslandicus

Binomial name
- Murexsul queenslandicus Houart, 2004

= Murexsul queenslandicus =

Species of gastropod

Murexsul queenslandicus is a species of sea snail, a marine gastropod mollusk in the family Muricidae, the murex snails or rock snails.

== Distribution ==
This marine species occurs off Queensland, Australia.
