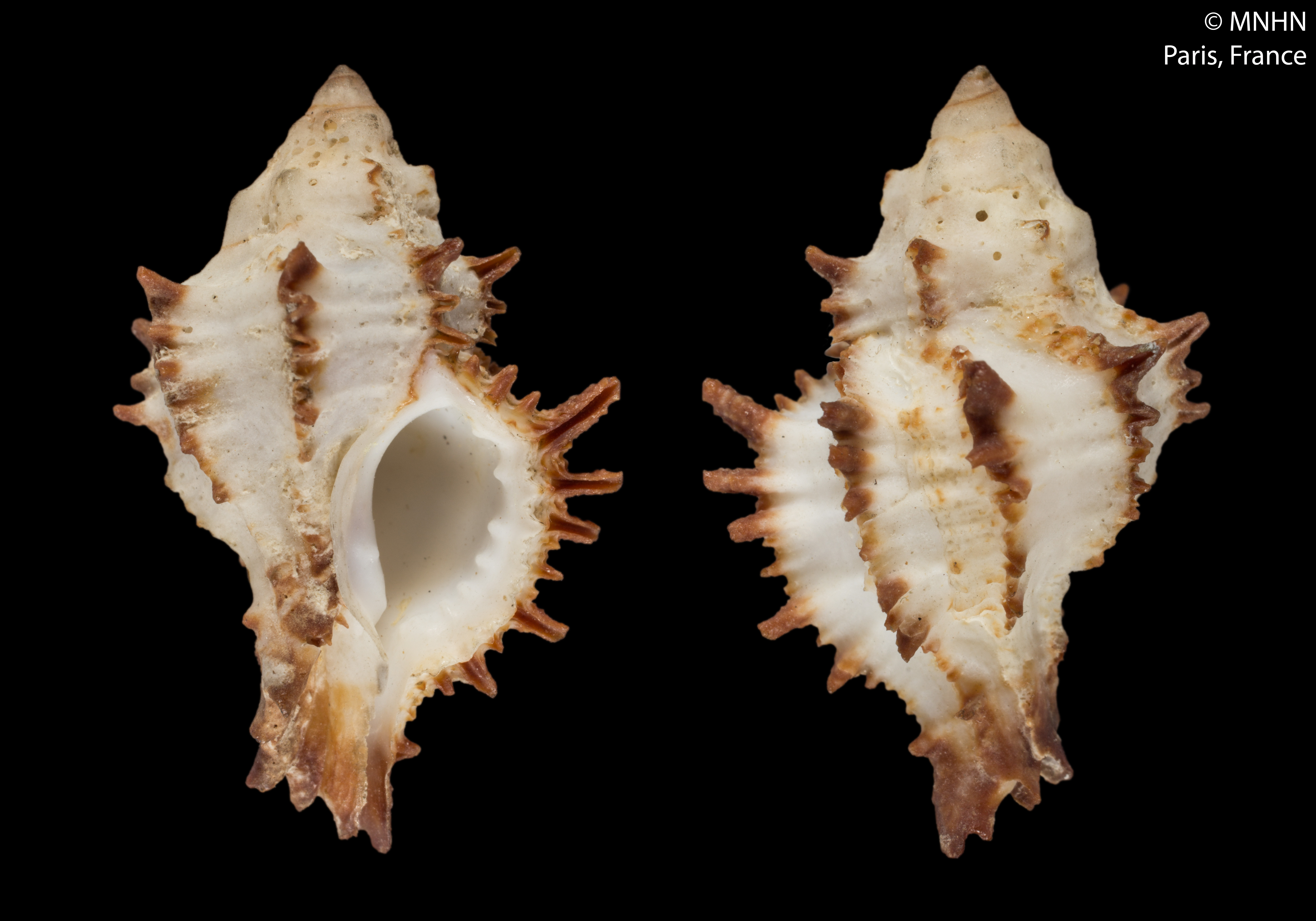
- Shell of Murexsul cuspidatus (syntype at MNHN, Paris)

Scientific classification
- Kingdom: Animalia
- Phylum: Mollusca
- Class: Gastropoda
- Subclass: Caenogastropoda
- Order: Neogastropoda
- Family: Muricidae
- Genus: Murexsul
- Species: M. cuspidatus

Binomial name
- Murexsul cuspidatus (G.B. Sowerby II, 1879)

Synonyms
- Murex cuspidatus G.B. Sowerby II, 1879

= Murexsul cuspidatus =

Species of gastropod

Murexsul cuspidatus is a species of sea snail, a marine gastropod mollusk in the family Muricidae, the murex snails or rock snails.

== Distribution ==
This marine species occurs off Japan.
