= Murexsul purpurispinus =

Scientific classification
- Kingdom: Animalia
- Phylum: Mollusca
- Class: Gastropoda
- Subclass: Caenogastropoda
- Order: Neogastropoda
- Family: Muricidae
- Genus: Murexsul
- Species: M. purpurispinus

Binomial name
- Murexsul purpurispinus (Ponder, 1972)

Synonyms
- Muricopsis purpurispina Ponder, 1972

Species of gastropod

Murexsul purpurispinus is a species of sea snail, a marine gastropod mollusk in the family Muricidae, the murex snails or rock snails.
