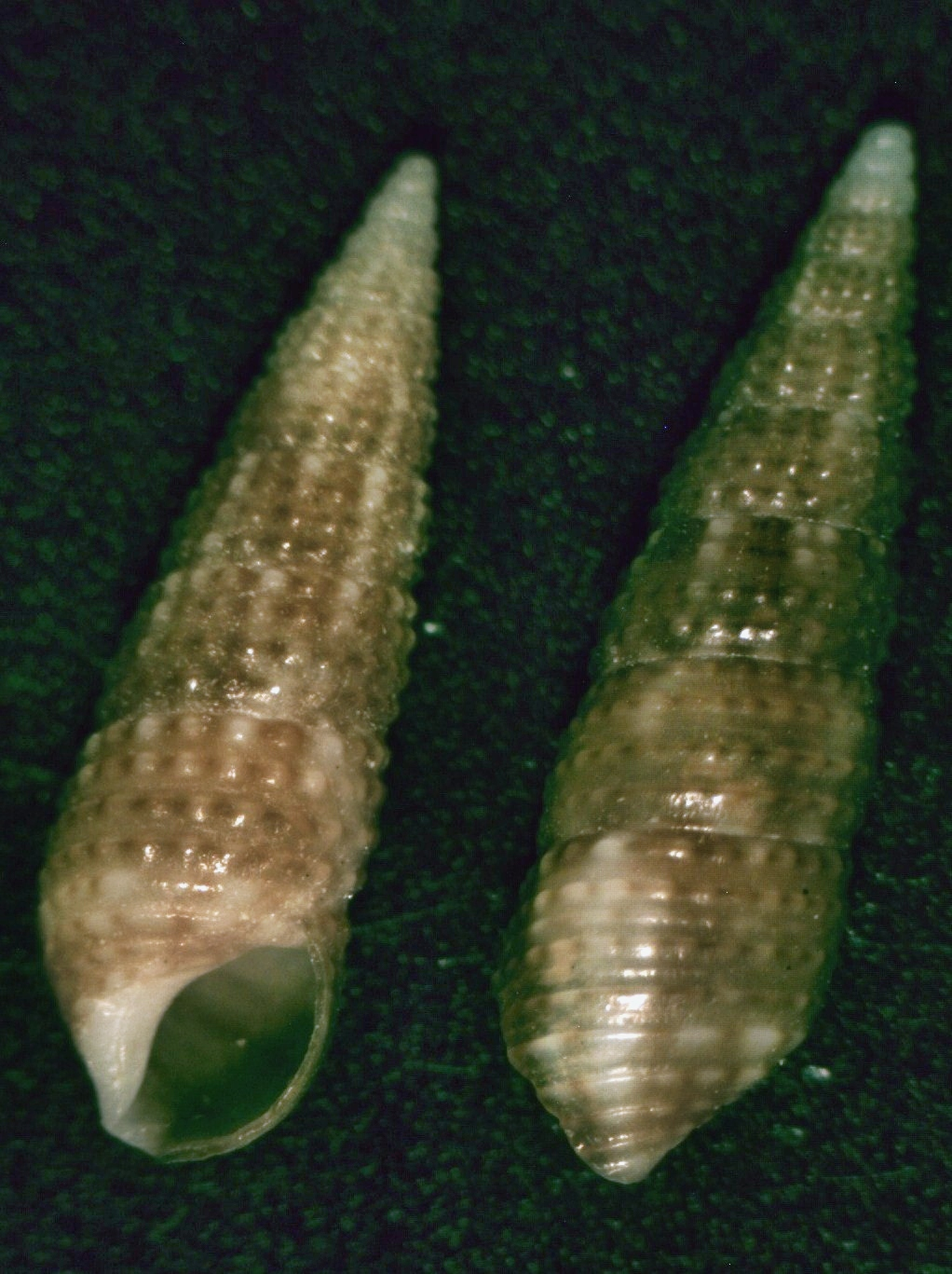
- Cacozeliana granarium

Scientific classification
- Kingdom: Animalia
- Phylum: Mollusca
- Class: Gastropoda
- Subclass: Caenogastropoda
- Order: incertae sedis
- Family: Cerithiidae
- Genus: Cacozeliana; Strand, 1928

Synonyms
- Cacozelia Iredale, 1924

= Cacozeliana =

Genus of gastropods

Cacozeliana is a genus of sea snails, marine gastropod mollusks in the family Cerithiidae.

== Species ==
Species within the genus Cacozeliana include:

- Cacozeliana furva (Watson, 1886)
- Cacozeliana fuscocapitulum (Hedley & Petterd, 1906)
- Cacozeliana granarium (Kiener, 1842)
- Cacozeliana icarus (Bayle, 1880)
- Cacozeliana variegata (Henn & Brazier, 1894)

Species brought into synonymy

- Cacozeliana granaria : synonym of Cacozeliana granarium (Kiener, 1842)
