= Murexsul jaliscoensis =

Scientific classification
- Kingdom: Animalia
- Phylum: Mollusca
- Class: Gastropoda
- Subclass: Caenogastropoda
- Order: Neogastropoda
- Family: Muricidae
- Genus: Murexsul
- Species: M. jaliscoensis

Binomial name
- Murexsul jaliscoensis (Radwin & D'Attilio, 1970)

Synonyms
- Muricopsis jaliscoensis Radwin & D'Attilio, 1970

Species of gastropod

Murexsul jaliscoensis is a species of sea snail, a marine gastropod mollusk in the family Muricidae, the murex snails or rock snails.
