= Murexsul auratus =

Scientific classification
- Kingdom: Animalia
- Phylum: Mollusca
- Class: Gastropoda
- Subclass: Caenogastropoda
- Order: Neogastropoda
- Family: Muricidae
- Genus: Murexsul
- Species: M. auratus

Binomial name
- Murexsul auratus Kuroda & Habe, 1971

Synonyms
- Murexsul bargibanti Houart, 1991; Muricopsis (Murexsul) bargibanti Houart, 1991

Species of gastropod

Murexsul auratus is a species of sea snail, a marine gastropod mollusk in the family Muricidae, the murex snails or rock snails.
