= Murexsul emipowlusi =

Scientific classification
- Kingdom: Animalia
- Phylum: Mollusca
- Class: Gastropoda
- Subclass: Caenogastropoda
- Order: Neogastropoda
- Family: Muricidae
- Genus: Murexsul
- Species: M. emipowlusi

Binomial name
- Murexsul emipowlusi (Abbott, 1954)

Synonyms
- Ocenebra (Ocinebrina) emipowlusi Abbott, 1954

Species of gastropod

Murexsul emipowlusi is a species of sea snail, a marine gastropod mollusk in the family Muricidae, the murex snails or rock snails.
