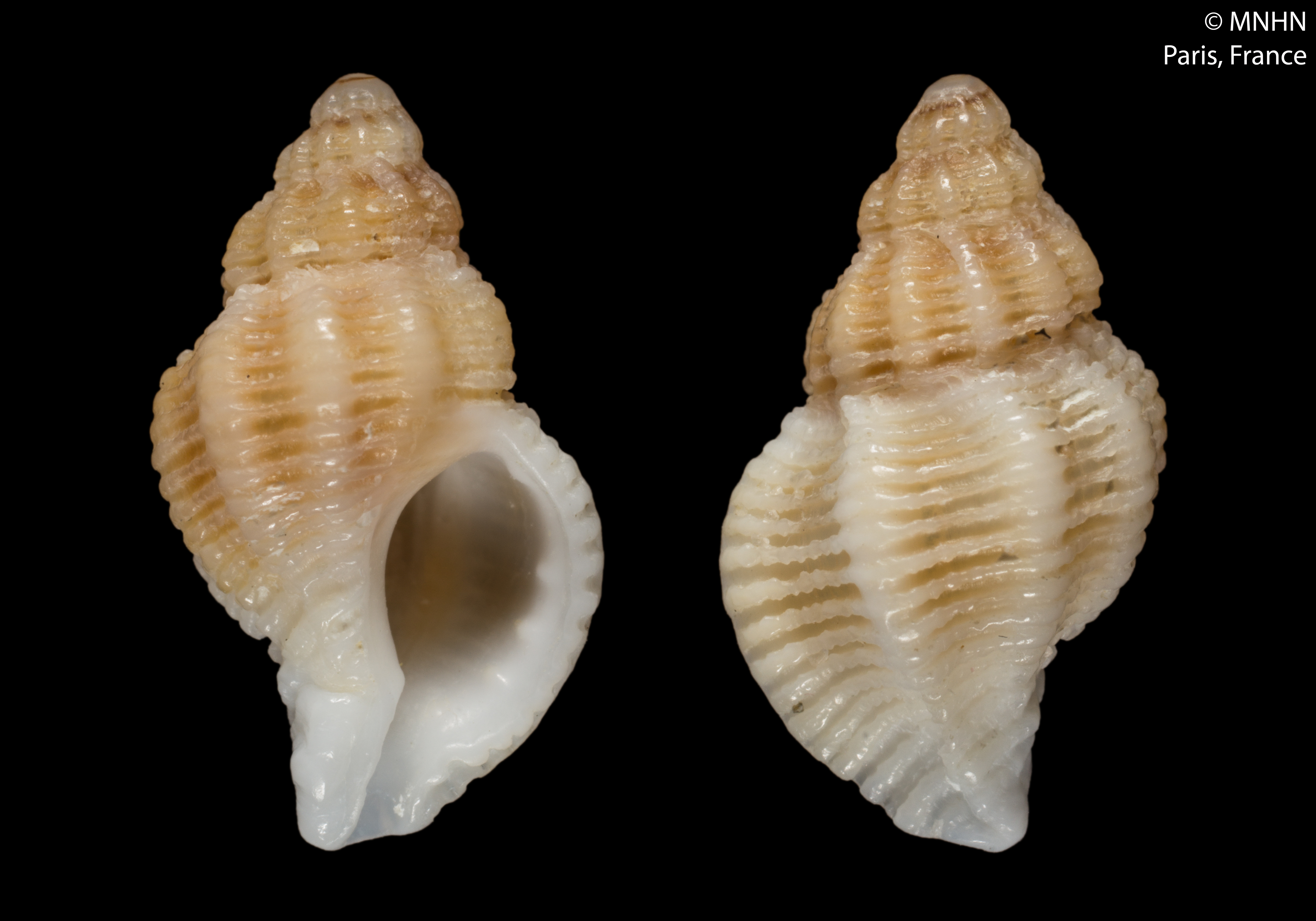
- Shell of Murexsul planiliratus (holotype at MNHN, Paris)

Scientific classification
- Kingdom: Animalia
- Phylum: Mollusca
- Class: Gastropoda
- Subclass: Caenogastropoda
- Order: Neogastropoda
- Family: Muricidae
- Genus: Murexsul
- Species: M. planiliratus

Binomial name
- Murexsul planiliratus (Reeve, 1845)

Synonyms
- Murex fimbriatus Lamarck, 1822 (not Brocchi); Murex planiliratus Reeve, 1845; Murex polypleurus Brazier, 1894; Ocinebrina lucasi Bozzetti, 2007

= Murexsul planiliratus =

Species of gastropod

Murexsul planiliratus is a species of sea snail, a marine gastropod mollusk in the family Muricidae, the murex snails or rock snails.

== Description ==
The length of the shell attains 13.35 mm.

== Distribution ==
This marine species occurs off Sri Lanka.
