= Murexsul asper =

Scientific classification
- Kingdom: Animalia
- Phylum: Mollusca
- Class: Gastropoda
- Subclass: Caenogastropoda
- Order: Neogastropoda
- Family: Muricidae
- Genus: Murexsul
- Species: M. asper

Binomial name
- Murexsul asper Houart, 2004

Species of gastropod

Murexsul asper is a species of sea snail, a marine gastropod mollusk in the family Muricidae, the murex snails or rock snails.
