= Murexsul sunderlandi =

Scientific classification
- Kingdom: Animalia
- Phylum: Mollusca
- Class: Gastropoda
- Subclass: Caenogastropoda
- Order: Neogastropoda
- Family: Muricidae
- Genus: Murexsul
- Species: M. sunderlandi

Binomial name
- Murexsul sunderlandi (Petuch, 1987)

Synonyms
- Muricopsis sunderlandi Petuch, 1987

Species of gastropod

Murexsul sunderlandi is a species of sea snail, a marine gastropod mollusk in the family Muricidae, the murex snails or rock snails.

== Description ==
Original description: "Shell very thin, lightweight, with high protracted spire and long, straight siphonal canal; shell with 3 varices per whorl; varices thin, low, with 3 thin spines; spine on shoulder longest; siphonal canal with 1 short spine near junction with body whorl; aperture large, flaring; parietal shield large, erect, nonadherent; shell color pale tan overlaid with 8-10 reddish-brown spiral lines; intervarical regions with 5 low, faintly nodose axial ribs; area between spines on varices with numerous reddish-brown ribs; ribs correspond to spiral lines of intervarical regions; interior of aperture white, with reddish-brown lines showing through."

== Distribution ==
Locus typicus: "Off Cabo La Vela, Goajira Peninsula, Colombia."
