= Murexsul skoglundae =

Scientific classification
- Kingdom: Animalia
- Phylum: Mollusca
- Class: Gastropoda
- Subclass: Caenogastropoda
- Order: Neogastropoda
- Family: Muricidae
- Genus: Murexsul
- Species: M. skoglundae

Binomial name
- Murexsul skoglundae (Myers, Hertz & D'Attilio, 1993)

Synonyms
- Muricopsis skoglundae Myers, Hertz & D'Attilio, 1993

Species of gastropod

Murexsul skoglundae is a species of sea snail, a marine gastropod mollusk in the family Muricidae, the murex snails or rock snails.
