= Murexsul mbotyiensis =

Scientific classification
- Kingdom: Animalia
- Phylum: Mollusca
- Class: Gastropoda
- Subclass: Caenogastropoda
- Order: Neogastropoda
- Family: Muricidae
- Genus: Murexsul
- Species: M. mbotyiensis

Binomial name
- Murexsul mbotyiensis (Houart, 1991)

Synonyms
- Muricopsis mbotyiensis Houart, 1991

Species of gastropod

Murexsul mbotyiensis is a species of sea snail, a marine gastropod mollusk in the family Muricidae, the murex snails or rock snails.
