= Murexsul mildredae =

Scientific classification
- Kingdom: Animalia
- Phylum: Mollusca
- Class: Gastropoda
- Subclass: Caenogastropoda
- Order: Neogastropoda
- Family: Muricidae
- Genus: Murexsul
- Species: M. mildredae

Binomial name
- Murexsul mildredae (Poorman, 1980)

Synonyms
- Murexiella mildredae Poorman, 1980

Species of gastropod

Murexsul mildredae is a species of sea snail, a marine gastropod mollusk in the family Muricidae, the murex snails or rock snails.
