= Murexsul dipsacus =

Scientific classification
- Kingdom: Animalia
- Phylum: Mollusca
- Class: Gastropoda
- Subclass: Caenogastropoda
- Order: Neogastropoda
- Family: Muricidae
- Genus: Murexsul
- Species: M. dipsacus

Binomial name
- Murexsul dipsacus (Broderip, 1833)

Synonyms
- Murex dipsacus Broderip, 1833; Murex octonus Gray in Sowerby, 1841

Species of gastropod

Murexsul dipsacus is a species of sea snail, a marine gastropod mollusk in the family Muricidae, the murex snails or rock snails.
