= Cacozeliana furva =

Scientific classification
- Kingdom: Animalia
- Phylum: Mollusca
- Class: Gastropoda
- Subclass: Caenogastropoda
- Order: incertae sedis
- Family: Cerithiidae
- Genus: Cacozeliana
- Species: C. furva

Binomial name
- Cacozeliana furva (Watson, 1886)

Synonyms
- Bittium furvum Watson, 1886

Species of gastropod

Cacozeliana furva is a species of sea snail, a marine gastropod mollusk in the family Cerithiidae.
