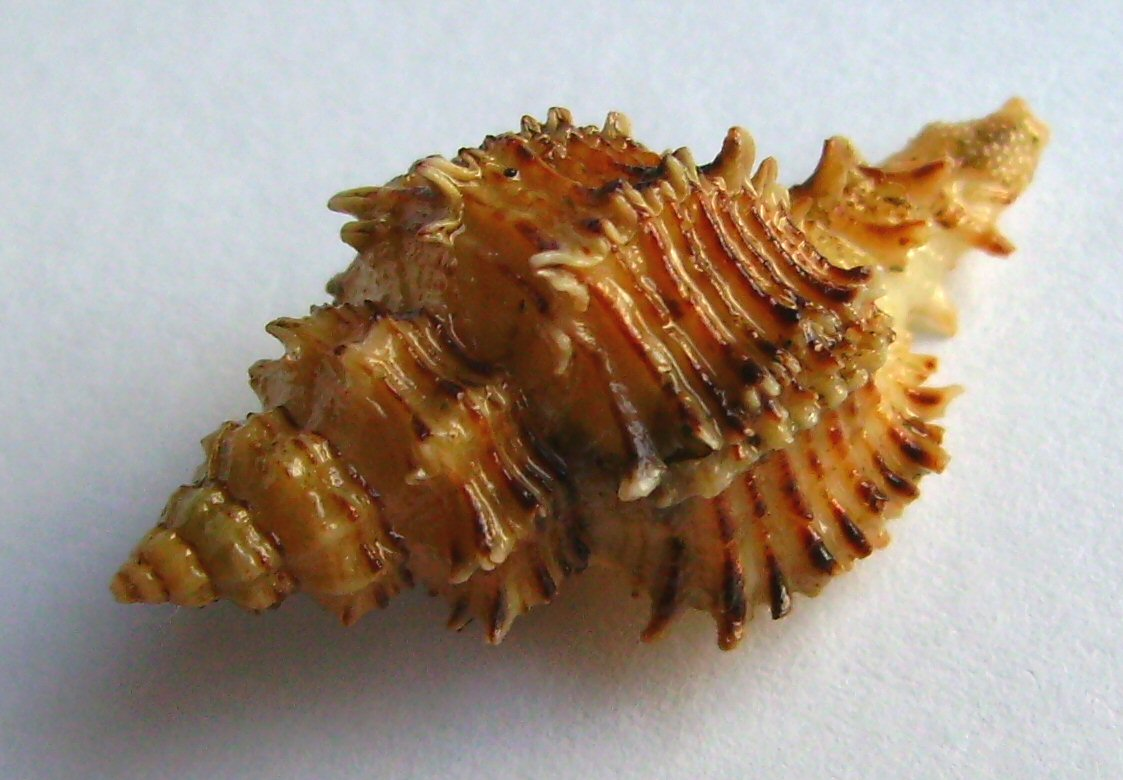
- Murexsul ocotgonus

Scientific classification
- Kingdom: Animalia
- Phylum: Mollusca
- Class: Gastropoda
- Subclass: Caenogastropoda
- Order: Neogastropoda
- Family: Muricidae
- Genus: Murexsul
- Species: M. octogonus

Binomial name
- Murexsul octogonus (Quoy and Gaimard, 1833)

Synonyms
- Murex (Murexsul) ednae M. Smith, 1940 (original combination; junior synonym); Murex ednae M. Smith, 1940; Murex octogonus Quoy & Gaimard, 1833 (original combination); Murex peruvianus G. B. Sowerby II, 1841 (invalid: junior homonym of Murex peruvianus Lamarck, 1816): Murexsul cuvierensis Finlay, 1927; Muricopsis (Murexsul) octogonus (Quoy & Gaimard, 1833); Muricopsis octogonus (Quoy & Gaimard, 1833)

= Murexsul octogonus =

Species of gastropod

Murexsul octogonus, or the octagonal murex, is a species of sea snail, a marine gastropod mollusk in the family Muricidae, the murex snails or rock snails.

== Description ==
The length of the shell attains 35.6 mm.

== Distribution ==
This species is known only from North Island, New Zealand.
