= Murexsul multispinosus =

Scientific classification
- Kingdom: Animalia
- Phylum: Mollusca
- Class: Gastropoda
- Subclass: Caenogastropoda
- Order: Neogastropoda
- Family: Muricidae
- Genus: Murexsul
- Species: M. multispinosus

Binomial name
- Murexsul multispinosus (Sowerby, 1904)

Synonyms
- Murex multispinosus Sowerby, 1904; Poirieria azami Kuroda, 1929

Species of gastropod

Murexsul multispinosus is a species of sea snail, a marine gastropod mollusk in the family Muricidae, the murex snails or rock snails.
