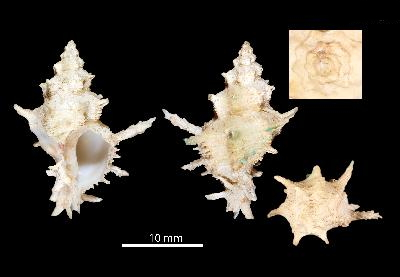
- Shell of Murexsul ianlochi (holotype at the MNHN, Paris)

Scientific classification
- Kingdom: Animalia
- Phylum: Mollusca
- Class: Gastropoda
- Subclass: Caenogastropoda
- Order: Neogastropoda
- Family: Muricidae
- Genus: Murexsul
- Species: M. ianlochi

Binomial name
- Murexsul ianlochi Houart, 1986

Synonyms
- Muricopsis (Murexsul) ianlochi Houart, 1987 (basionym); Muricopsis ianlochi Houart, 1987

= Murexsul ianlochi =

Species of gastropod

Murexsul ianlochi is a species of sea snail, a marine gastropod mollusk in the family Muricidae, that include murex snails and rock snails.
