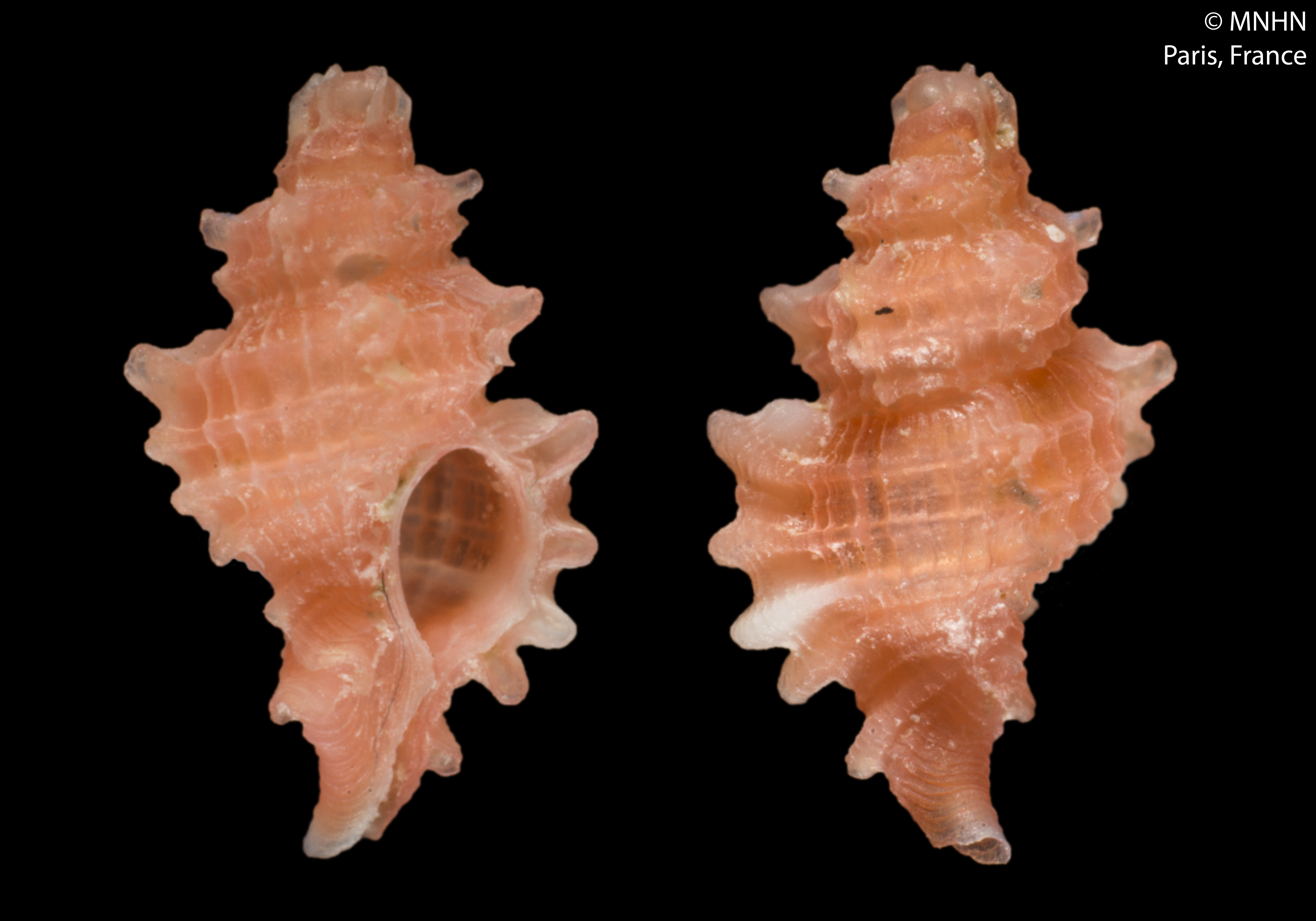
- Shell of Murexsul micra (holotype at MNHN, Paris)

Scientific classification
- Kingdom: Animalia
- Phylum: Mollusca
- Class: Gastropoda
- Subclass: Caenogastropoda
- Order: Neogastropoda
- Family: Muricidae
- Genus: Murexsul
- Species: M. micra

Binomial name
- Murexsul micra (Houart, 2001)

Synonyms
- Muricopsis (Murexsul) micra Houart, 2001

= Murexsul micra =

Species of gastropod

Murexsul micra is a species of sea snail, a marine gastropod mollusk in the family Muricidae, the murex snails or rock snails.

== Distribution ==
This marine species occurs off New Caledonia.
