= Murexsul cevikeri =

Scientific classification
- Kingdom: Animalia
- Phylum: Mollusca
- Class: Gastropoda
- Subclass: Caenogastropoda
- Order: Neogastropoda
- Family: Muricidae
- Genus: Murexsul
- Species: M. cevikeri

Binomial name
- Murexsul cevikeri (Houart, 2000)

Synonyms
- Muricopsis cevikeri (Houart, 2000)

Species of gastropod

Murexsul cevikeri is a species of sea snail, a marine gastropod mollusk in the family Muricidae, the murex snails or rock snails.
