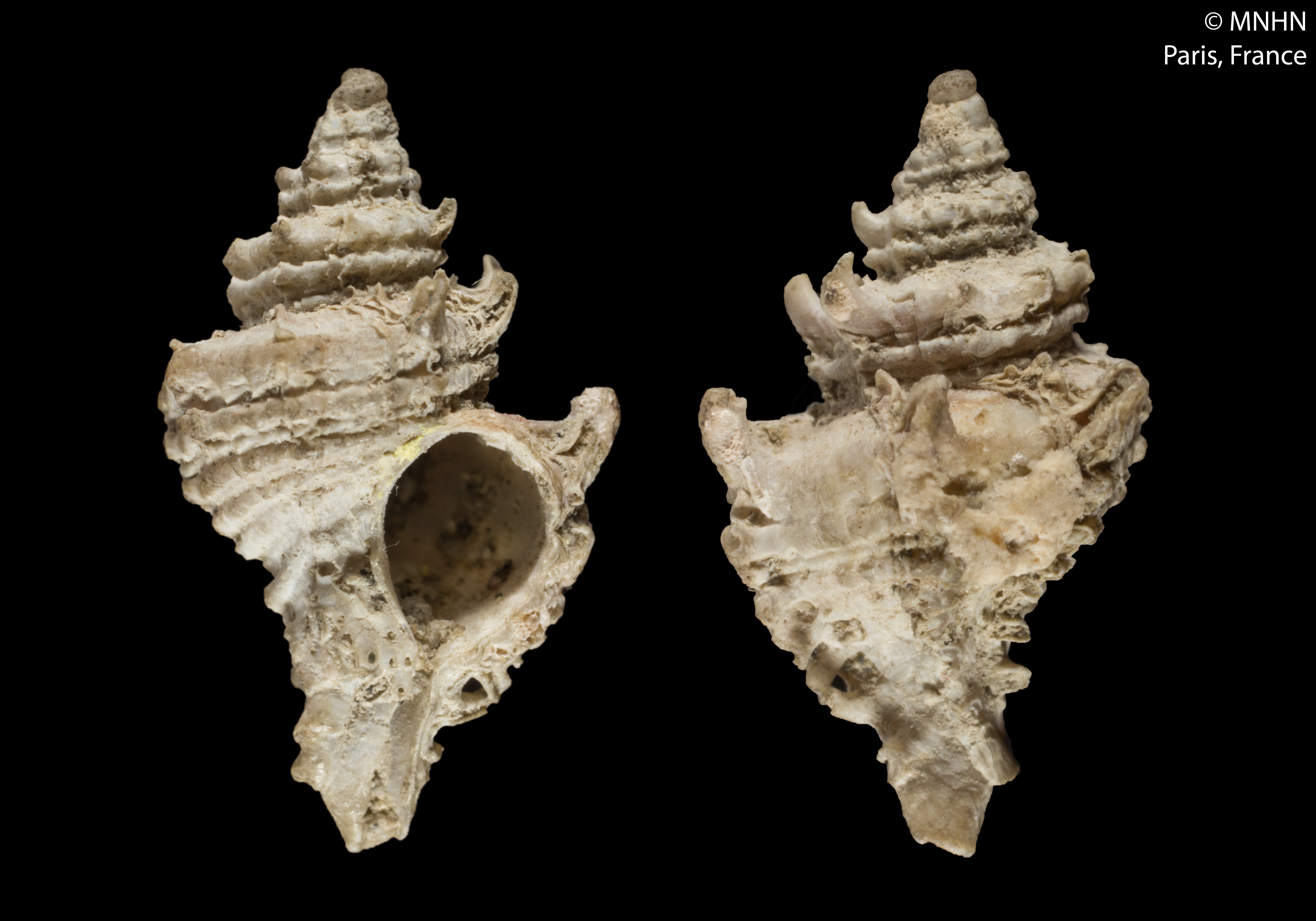
- Shell of Murexsul interserratus (syntype at MNHN, Paris)

Scientific classification
- Kingdom: Animalia
- Phylum: Mollusca
- Class: Gastropoda
- Subclass: Caenogastropoda
- Order: Neogastropoda
- Family: Muricidae
- Genus: Murexsul
- Species: M. interserratus

Binomial name
- Murexsul interserratus (G.B. Sowerby II, 1879)

Synonyms
- Murex ednae M. Smith, 1940; Murex interserratus G.B. Sowerby II, 1879

= Murexsul interserratus =

Species of gastropod

Murexsul interserratus is a species of sea snail, a marine gastropod mollusk in the family Muricidae, the murex snails or rock snails.
