= Murexsul profundus =

Scientific classification
- Kingdom: Animalia
- Phylum: Mollusca
- Class: Gastropoda
- Subclass: Caenogastropoda
- Order: Neogastropoda
- Family: Muricidae
- Genus: Murexsul
- Species: M. profundus

Binomial name
- Murexsul profundus (Marshall & Burch, 2000)

Synonyms
- Muricopsis (Murexsul) profunda Marshall & Burch, 2000; Muricopsis profunda B. A. Marshall & K. W. Burch, 2000 (original combination)

Species of gastropod

Murexsul profundus is a species of sea snail, a marine gastropod mollusk in the family Muricidae, the murex snails or rock snails.

== Distribution ==
This marine species is endemic to New Zealand.
