= Coralliophila lividorupis =

Scientific classification
- Kingdom: Animalia
- Phylum: Mollusca
- Class: Gastropoda
- Subclass: Caenogastropoda
- Order: Neogastropoda
- Superfamily: Muricoidea
- Family: Muricidae
- Subfamily: Coralliophilinae
- Genus: Coralliophila
- Species: †C. lividorupis

Binomial name
- †Coralliophila lividorupis (Laws, 1935)

Synonyms
- † Murexsul lividorupis Laws, 1935

Extinct species of gastropod

Coralliophila lividorupis is an extinct species of sea snail, a marine gastropod mollusk, in the family Muricidae, the murex snails or rock snails.

== Distribution ==
This species occurs in New Zealand.
