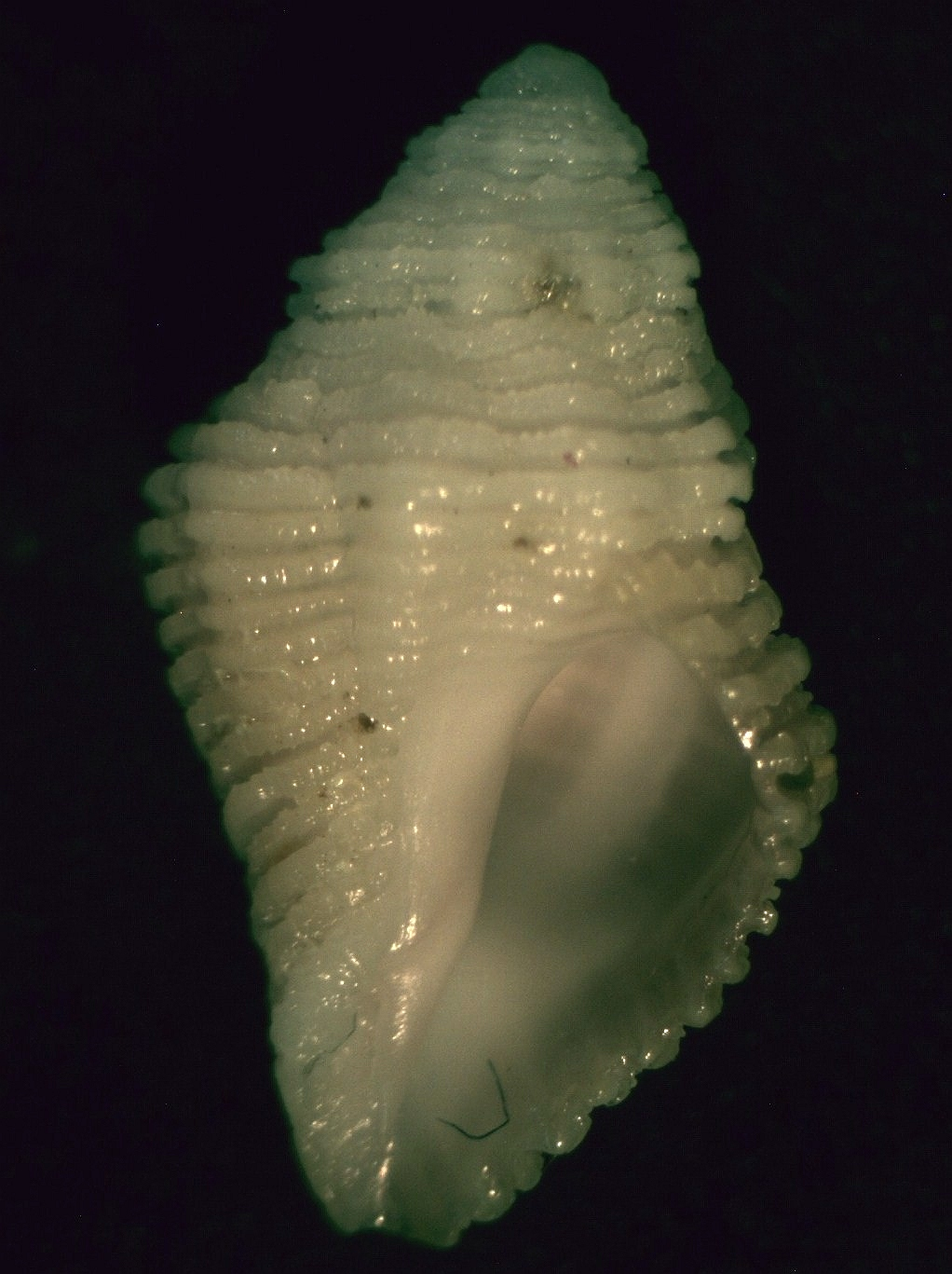

Scientific classification
- Kingdom: Animalia
- Phylum: Mollusca
- Class: Gastropoda
- Subclass: Caenogastropoda
- Order: Neogastropoda
- Superfamily: Muricoidea
- Family: Muricidae
- Subfamily: Coralliophilinae
- Genus: Coralliophila
- Species: C. mira

Binomial name
- Coralliophila mira (Cotton & Godfrey, 1932)

Synonyms
- † Murexsul tepikiensis Powell, 1934; Rapana mira Cotton & Godfrey, 1932

= Coralliophila mira =

Species of gastropod

Coralliophila mira is a species of sea snail, a marine gastropod mollusk, in the family Muricidae, the murex snails or rock snails.

== Gallery ==
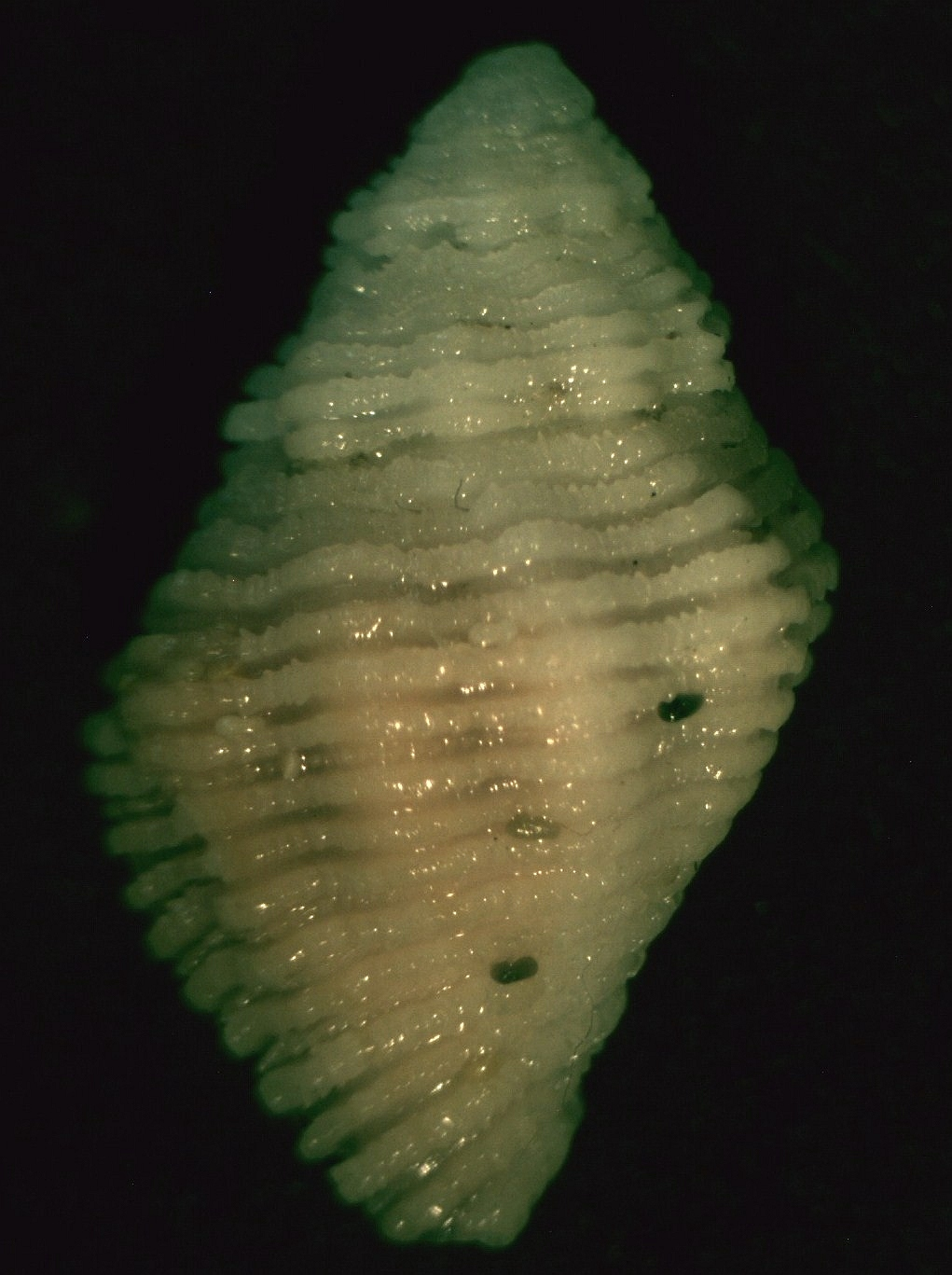
Reverse view of shell

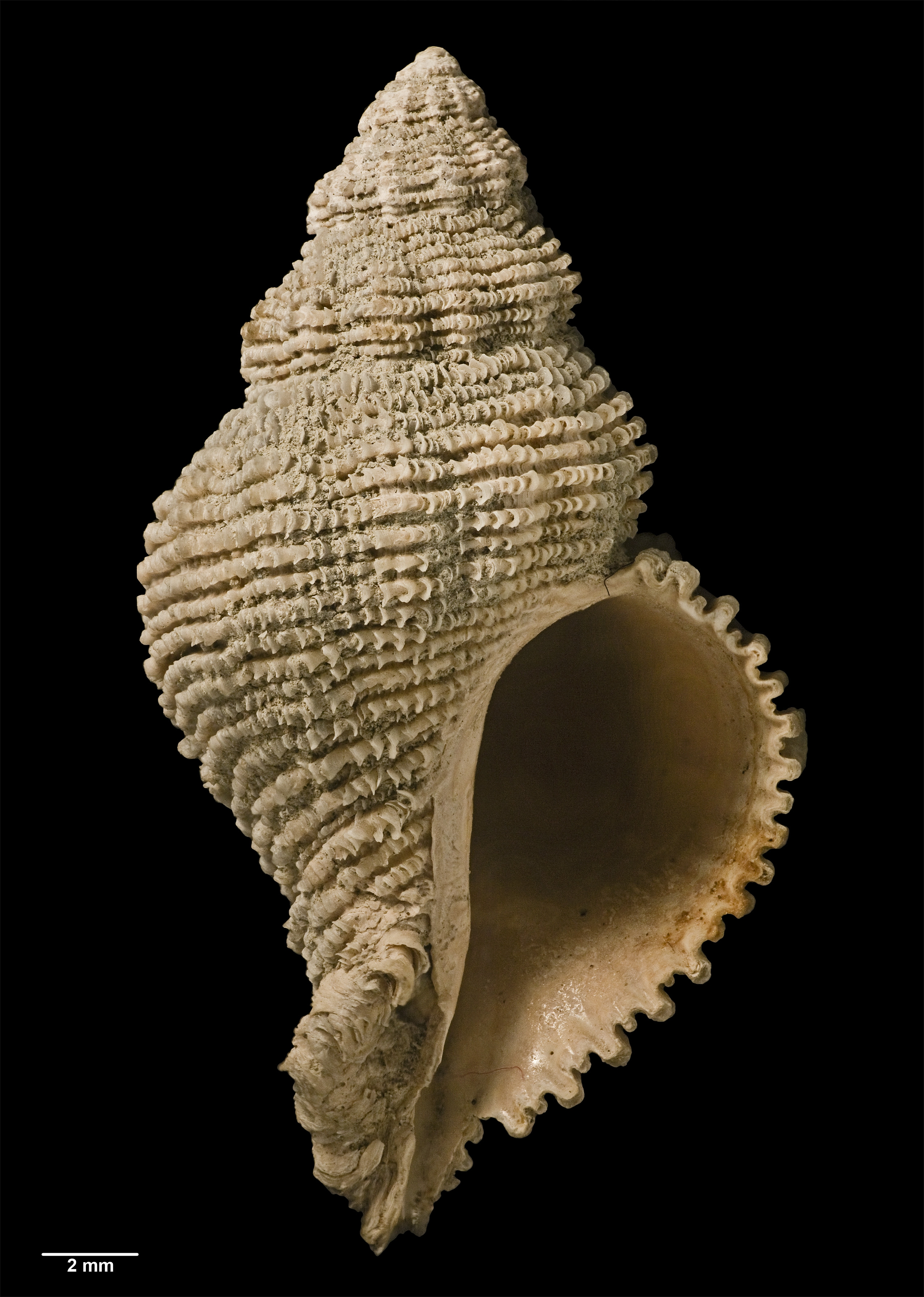
Type specimen

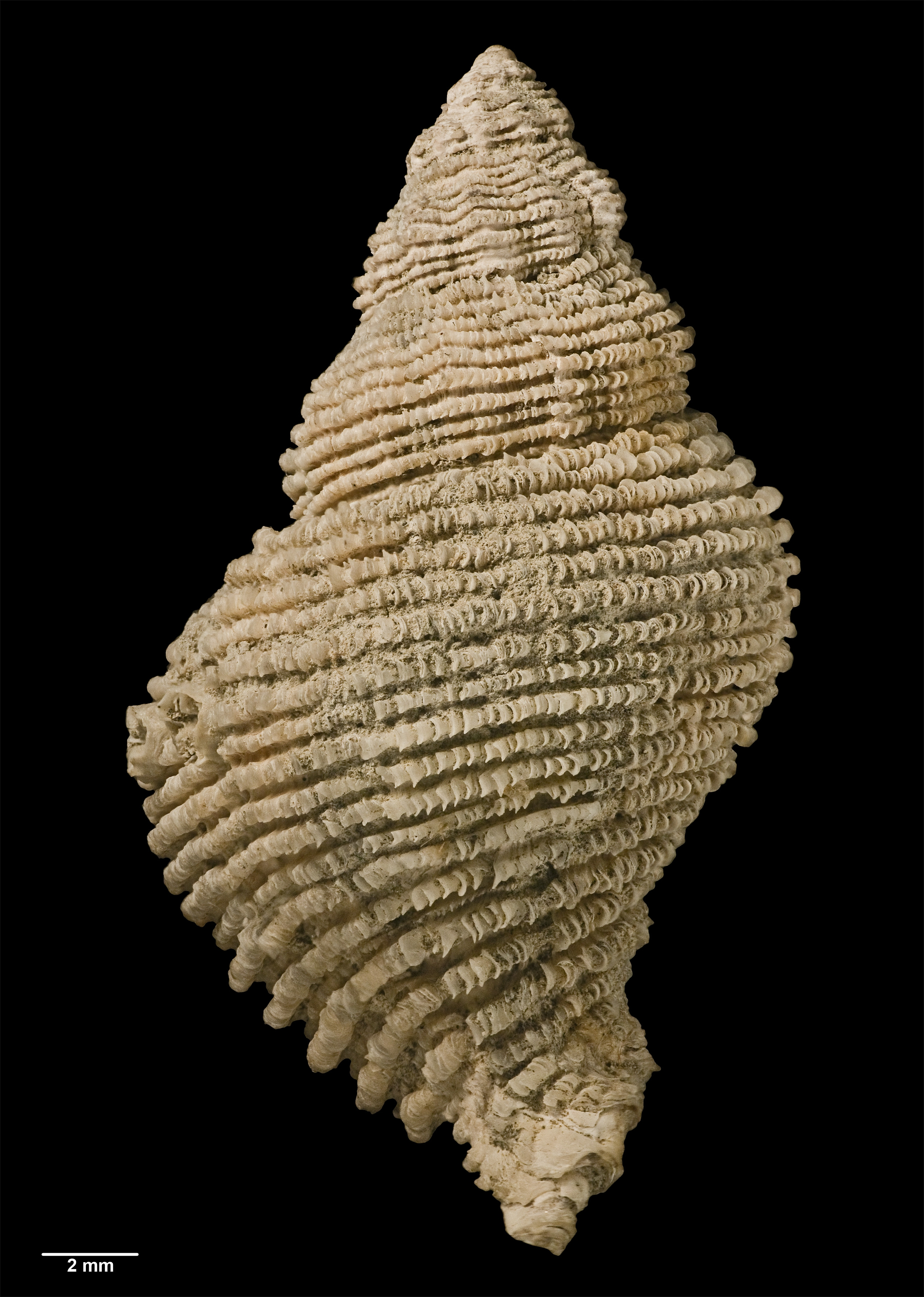
Reverse view of type specimen
