= Profunda =

Profunda may refer to:

- Profunda brachii
- Profunda femoris artery or vein
