= Pleurotoma =

Pleurotoma may refer to:

- Pleurotoma Lamarck, 1799, a genus of gastropods in the family Turridae, synonym of Turris
- Pleurotoma Mörch, 1869, a genus of gastropods in the family Mangeliidae, synonym of Oenopota
- Pleurotoma, a fossil genus of sponges in the order Lychniscosida, family unknown, synonym of Jima
