= Louis Charles Kiener =

French zoologist

Louis Charles Kiener (31 July 1799 – 24 July 1881) was a French malacologist born in Paris.

He was the author of the 12-volume Spécies général et iconographie des coquilles vivantes comprenant la collection du Muséum d'histoire naturelle de Paris, la collection Lamarck, celle du prince Masséna (appartenant maintenant a M.B. Delessert) et les découvertes récentes des voyageurs, translated into English as "General species and iconography of recent shells : comprising the Massena Museum, the collection of Lamarck, the collection of the Museum of Natural History, and the recent discoveries of travellers.

The following are a few species named after him:

- Lophotriorchis kienerii (G. de Sparre, 1835)
- Murexsul kieneri (Reeve, 1845)
- Thais kieneri (Deshayes, 1844)
- Cypraea kieneri (Kiener's cowry) (Hidalgo, 1906).

== Bibliography ==
- Kiener L. C. (1839). Genre Pleurotome. (Pleurotoma, Lam.). In: “Spécies Général et Iconographie des Coquilles Vivantes 5”. J. B. Baillière. Paris. pp. 17–84.
