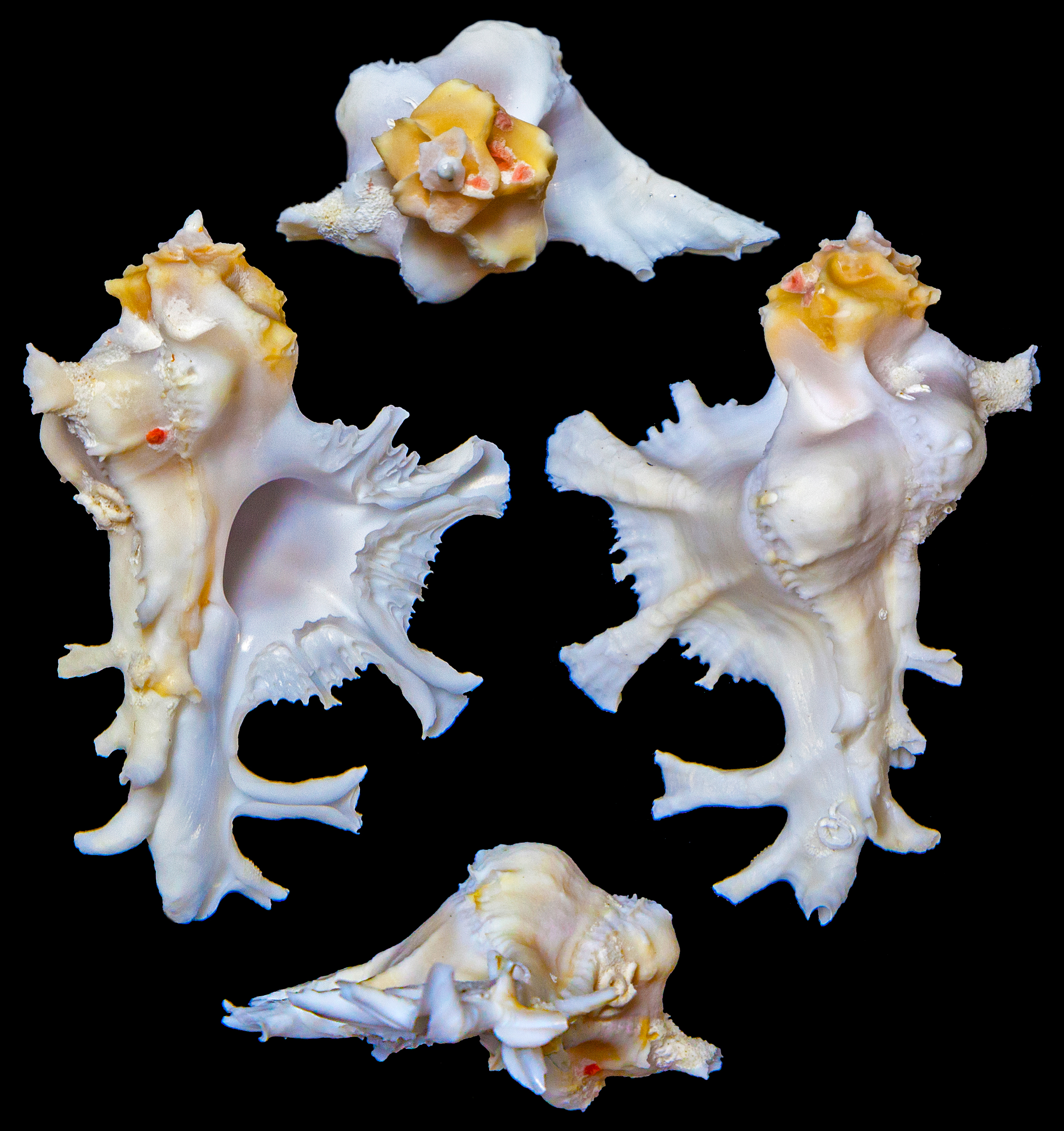
- Four views of a shell of Homalocantha anatomica

Scientific classification
- Kingdom: Animalia
- Phylum: Mollusca
- Class: Gastropoda
- Subclass: Caenogastropoda
- Order: Neogastropoda
- Family: Muricidae
- Genus: Homalocantha
- Species: H. anatomica

Binomial name
- Homalocantha anatomica (Perry, 1811)

Synonyms
- Hexaplex anatomica Perry, 1811; Homalocantha fauroti Jousseaume, 1888; Homalocantha rota (Mawe, 1823); Murex rota Mawe, 1823

= Homalocantha anatomica =

Species of gastropod

Homalocantha anatomica (common name: "Pele's Murex" or "Anatomical Murex") is a species of sea snail, a marine gastropod mollusk belonging to the family Muricidae, the murex snails or rock snails.

== Taxonomy ==
- Subspecies Homalocantha anatomica anatomica Perry, 1811
- Subspecies Homalocantha anatomica elatensis Heiman & Mienis, 2009 : synonym of Homalocantha elatensis Heiman & Mienis, 2009
- Subspecies Homalocantha anatomica pele H. A. Pilsbry, 1918
- Variety Homalocantha anatomica var. zamboi Burch & Burch, 1960 : synonym of Homalocantha zamboi (Burch & Burch, 1960)

== Distribution ==
This species occurs in the Red Sea and throughout the Indo-Western Pacific, from Japan, Philippines and Fiji to the Hawaiian Islands.

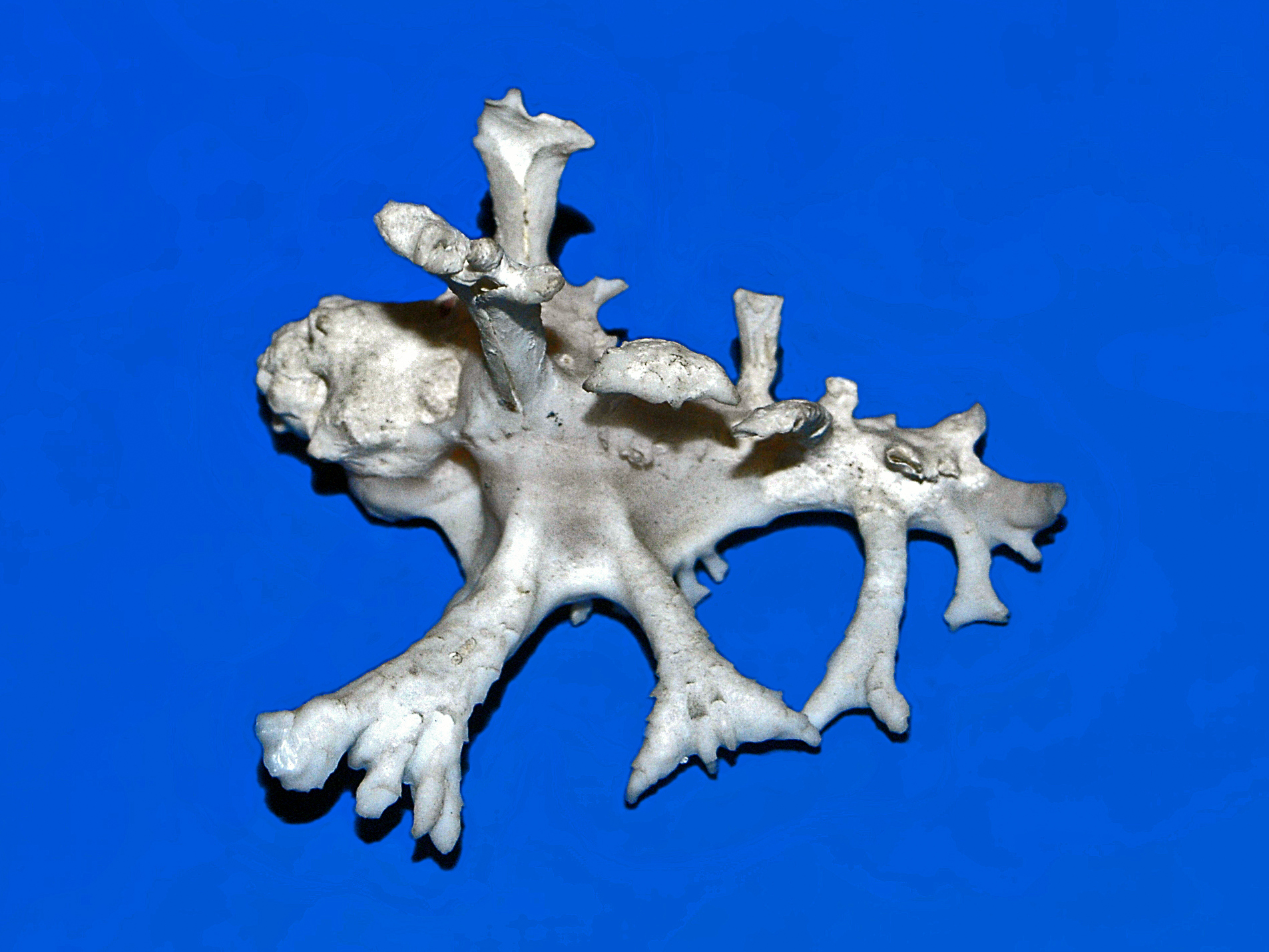
A shell of Homalocantha anatomica from Japan on display at the Museo Civico di Storia Naturale di Milano

== Description ==
Adult shell size of Homalocantha anatomica varies between 38 mm and 63 mm. These shells are solid, whitish in color, sometimes tinted with yellow or red and moderately light in weight, with five to six varices per whorl. Aperture is small and white or pink. Labial lip shows irregular denticles. Columella is smooth and siphonal canal is moderately long.

== Biology ==
These sea snails feed primarily on boring mussels in reef rocks.

== Bibliography ==
- Jousseaume, F., 1888. Description des mollusques recueillis par M. le Dr Faurot dans la Mer Rouge et le Golfe d'Aden. Mémoires de la Société Zoologique de France 1: 165-223
- A.G. Hinton - Guide to Shells of Papua New Guinea
- Abbott and Dance (1982). "Compendium of Seashells"
- Drivas, J.; Jay, M. (1987). Coquillages de La Réunion et de l'Île Maurice. Collection Les Beautés de la Nature. Delachaux et Niestlé: Neuchâtel. ISBN 2-603-00654-1. 159 pp.
- F. Springsteen and F. M. Leobrera - Shells of the Philippines
- George E. Radwin - Murex Shells of the World - An Illustrated Guide to the Muricidae
- Hirofumi Kubo and Taiji Kurozumi - Molluscs of Okinawa
- Severns, M. (2000). "Hawaiian Seashells"
- Liu, J.Y. [Ruiyu] (ed.). (2008). Checklist of marine biota of China seas. China Science Press. 1267 pp
- Houart R., Gori S. & Rosado J. (2017). The Muricidae (Gastropoda: Muricoidea) from Oman with the description of four new species. Novapex. 18(3): 41-69
