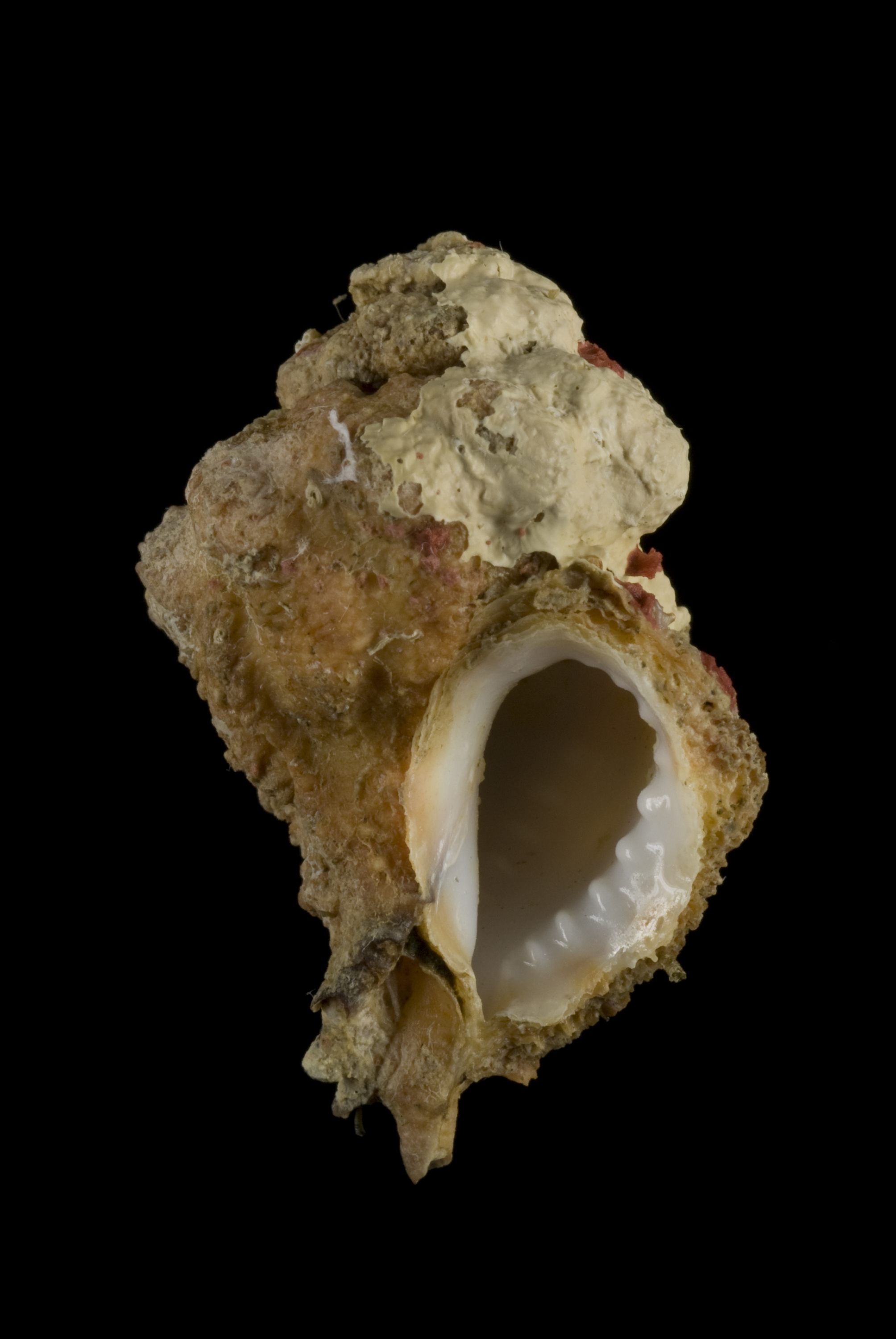
- shell of Vitularia miliaris (specimen at MNHN, Paris)

Scientific classification
- Kingdom: Animalia
- Phylum: Mollusca
- Class: Gastropoda
- Subclass: Caenogastropoda
- Order: Neogastropoda
- Family: Muricidae
- Subfamily: Muricopsinae
- Genus: Vitularia
- Species: V. miliaris

Binomial name
- Vitularia miliaris (Gmelin, 1791)

Synonyms
- Murex alutaceus Menke, 1829; Murex miliaris Gmelin, 1791; Murex purpura Deshayes, 1843; Murex vitulinus Lamarck, 1816; Purpura scabra Schumacher, 1817; Transtrafer longmani Iredale, 1929; Vitularia asiatica Kuroda in Kira, 1962; Vitularia tuberculata Swainson, 1840 ·; Vitulina tuberculata Swainson, 1840

= Vitularia miliaris =

Species of gastropod

Vitularia miliaris is a species of sea snail, a marine gastropod mollusk in the family Muricidae, the murex snails or rock snails.

== Description ==
The length of the shell varies between 21 mm and 56 mm.

The shell is whitish or brownish with irregular rounded ribs, which are sometimes tinged with chestnut, as though in interrupted revolving bands. The whole surface is peculiarly scabrously mamillated. The ribs are more prominent and more rounded, and the form is more ventricose and proportionately shorter than in Vitularia salebrosa.

== Distribution ==
This marine species has a wide distribution: Indo-west Pacific, from Red Sea to Philippines; Solomon Islands, Papua New Guinea, Indonesia, Fiji; also off Australia (Queensland, Western Australia).
