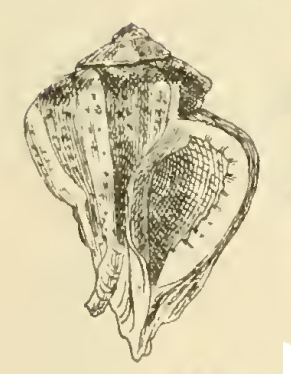
- Drawing of a shell of Vitularia crenifer

Scientific classification
- Kingdom: Animalia
- Phylum: Mollusca
- Class: Gastropoda
- Subclass: Caenogastropoda
- Order: Neogastropoda
- Family: Muricidae
- Subfamily: Muricopsinae
- Genus: Vitularia
- Species: V. crenifer

Binomial name
- Vitularia crenifer (Montrouzier, 1861)

Synonyms
- Murex crenifer Montrouzier in Souverbie, 1861; Ocinebra crenifera (Montrouzier in Souverbie, 1861)

= Vitularia crenifer =

Species of gastropod

Vitularia crenifer is a species of sea snail, a marine gastropod mollusk in the family Muricidae, the murex snails or rock snails.

== Description ==
The length of the yellowish-brown shell attains 35 mm.

== Distribution ==
This marine species occurs off the Philippines, the Loyalty Islands, New Caledonia and Hawaii.
