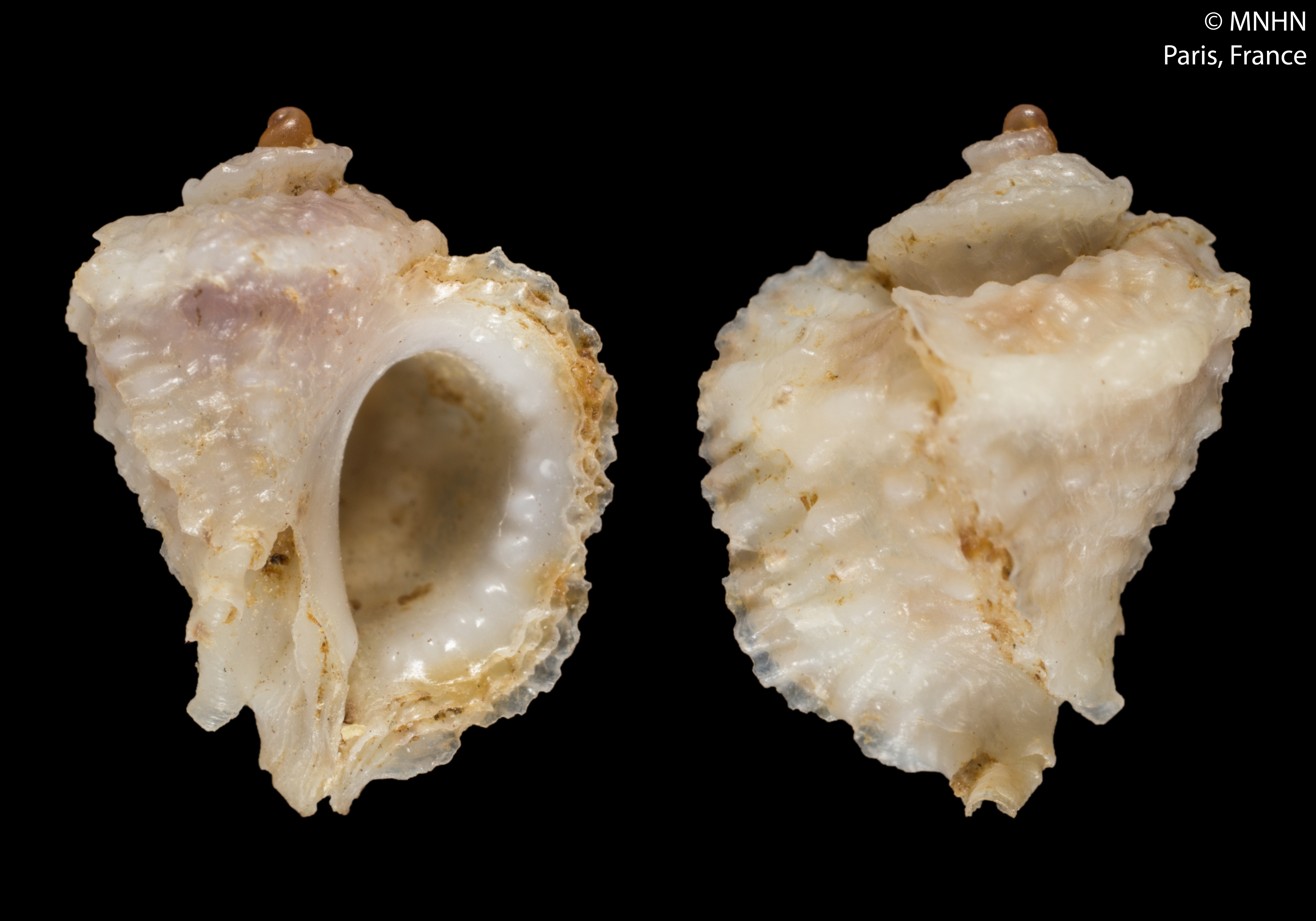
- shell of Vitularia minima (specimen at MNHN, Paris)

Scientific classification
- Kingdom: Animalia
- Phylum: Mollusca
- Class: Gastropoda
- Subclass: Caenogastropoda
- Order: Neogastropoda
- Family: Muricidae
- Subfamily: Muricopsinae
- Genus: Vitularia
- Species: V. minima

Binomial name
- Vitularia minima Bozzetti, 2006

= Vitularia minima =

Species of gastropod

Vitularia minima is a species of sea snail, a marine gastropod mollusk in the family Muricidae, the murex snails or rock snails.

== Description ==
The length of the shell varies between 12 mm and 20 mm.

== Distribution ==
This marine species occurs off Madagascar and Mozambique.
