= Maxwellia =

Maxwellia is the scientific name of two genera of organisms and may refer to:

- Maxwellia (gastropod), a genus of sea snails in the family Muricidae
- Maxwellia (plant), a genus of plants in the family Malvaceae
