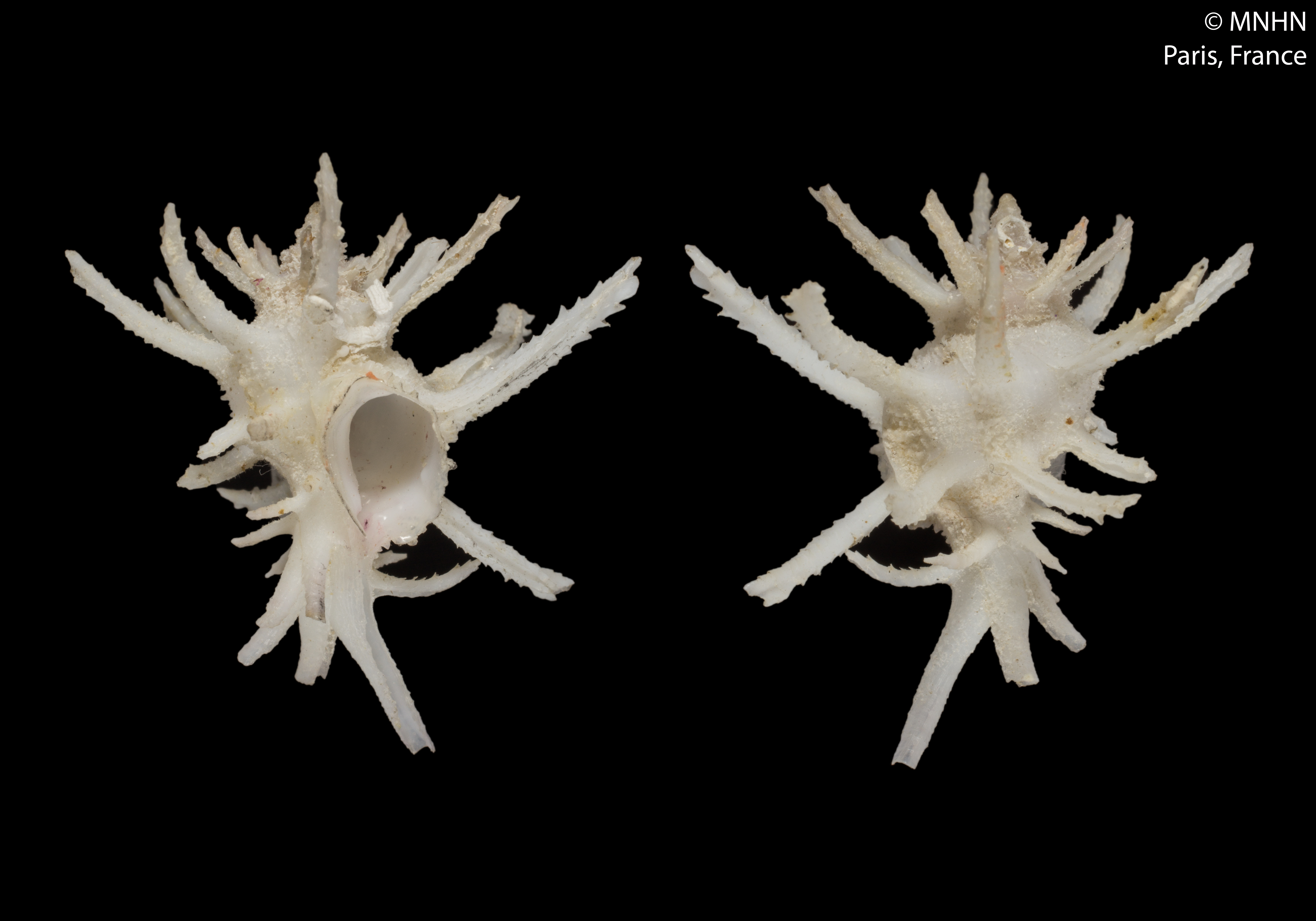
- Shell of Xastilia kosugei (holotype at MNHN, Paris)

Scientific classification
- Kingdom: Animalia
- Phylum: Mollusca
- Class: Gastropoda
- Subclass: Caenogastropoda
- Order: Neogastropoda
- Family: Muricidae
- Subfamily: Muricopsinae
- Genus: Xastilia
- Species: X. kosugei

Binomial name
- Xastilia kosugei Bouchet & Houart, 1994

= Xastilia kosugei =

Species of gastropod

Xastilia kosugei is a species of sea snail, a marine gastropod mollusk in the family Muricidae, the murex snails or rock snails.

== Distribution ==
The marine species occurs on the Lord Howe Ridge, South Pacific.
