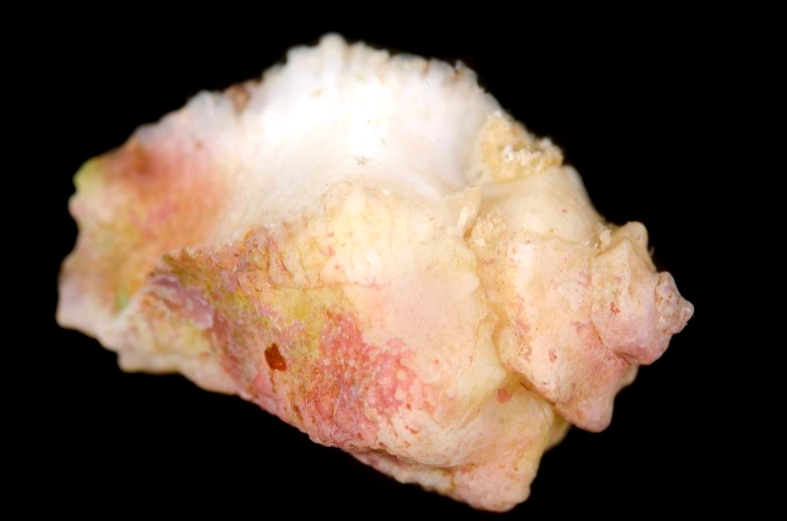
- Shell of Vitularia sandwicensis (specimen at the Smithsonian Institution)

Scientific classification
- Kingdom: Animalia
- Phylum: Mollusca
- Class: Gastropoda
- Subclass: Caenogastropoda
- Order: Neogastropoda
- Family: Muricidae
- Subfamily: Muricopsinae
- Genus: Vitularia
- Species: V. sandwicensis

Binomial name
- Vitularia sandwicensis (Pease, 1861)

Synonyms
- Murex sandwichensis Pease, 1861

= Vitularia sandwicensis =

Species of gastropod

Vitularia sandwicensis is a species of sea snail, a marine gastropod mollusk in the family Muricidae, the murex snails or rock snails.

== Description and distribution ==
The white shell is fusiformly ovate and rather thin. It has about three transverse rows of brown spots on the varices. It contains five sharply angulated whorls. The body whorl is angulated just below the suture. The six varices are slightly oblique and wrinkled. The aperture is white and oblong-ovate. The outer lip is denticulated within. The columella is slightly arched. The siphonal canal is short.

=== Distribution ===
This marine species occurs off Hawaii.
