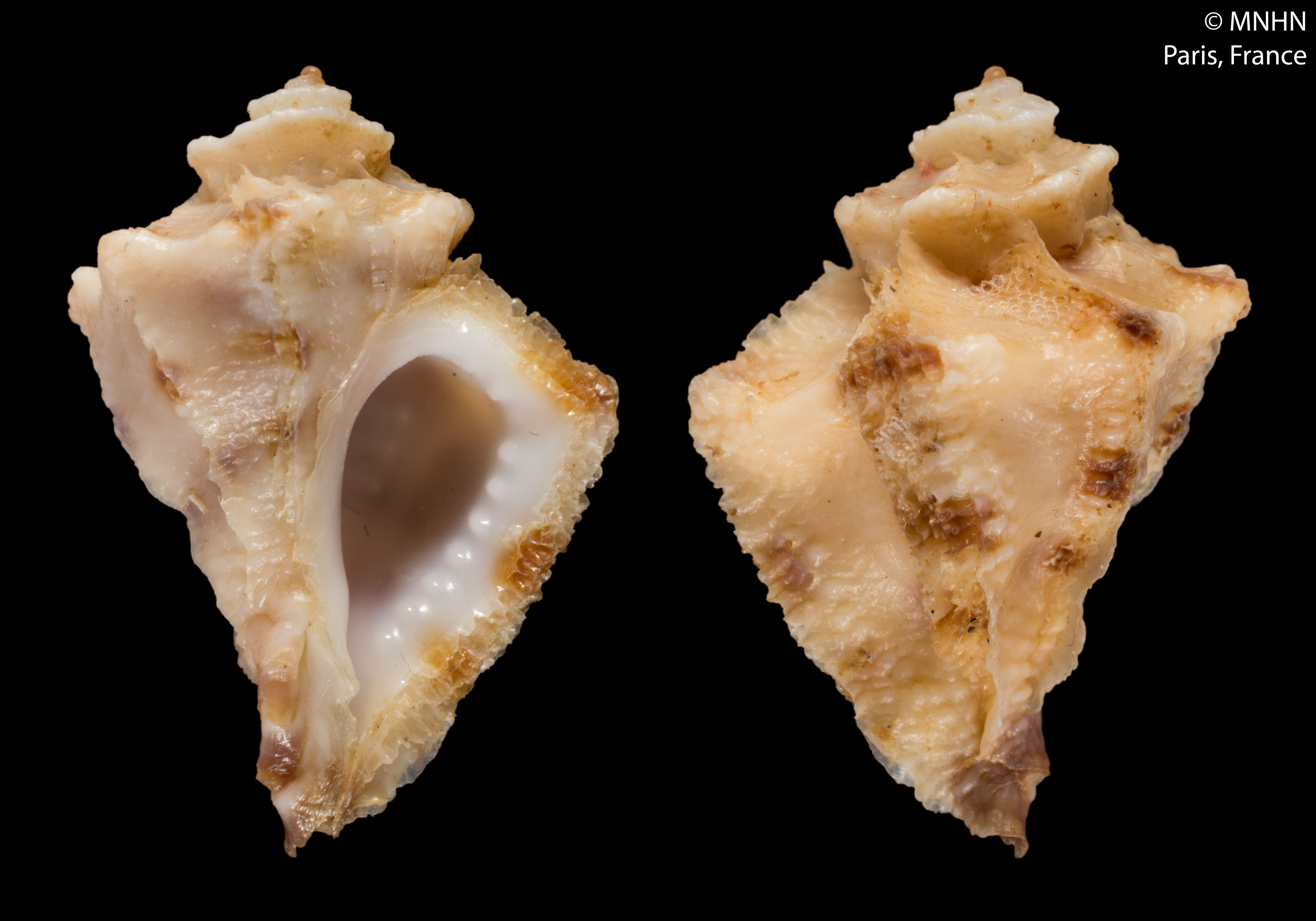
- Shell of Vitularia triangularis (specimen at MNHN, Paris)

Scientific classification
- Kingdom: Animalia
- Phylum: Mollusca
- Class: Gastropoda
- Subclass: Caenogastropoda
- Order: Neogastropoda
- Family: Muricidae
- Subfamily: Muricopsinae
- Genus: Vitularia
- Species: V. triangularis

Binomial name
- Vitularia triangularis Bozzetti, 2009

= Vitularia triangularis =

Species of gastropod

Vitularia triangularis is a species of sea snail, a marine gastropod mollusk in the family Muricidae, the murex snails or rock snails.

== Distribution ==
This marine species occurs off Madagascar.
