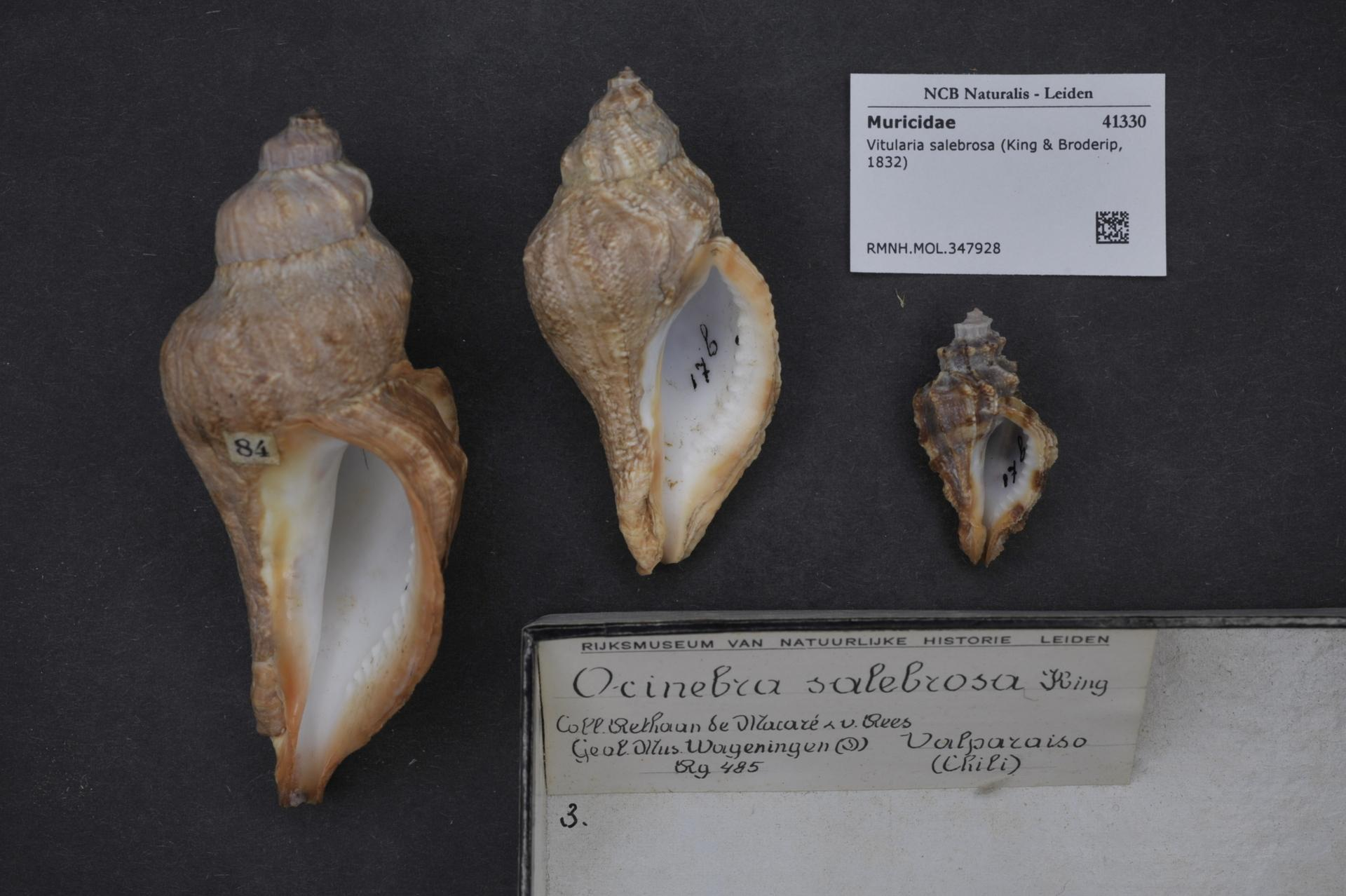
- shell of Vitularia salebrosa (specimen atNaturalis Biodiversity Center)

Scientific classification
- Kingdom: Animalia
- Phylum: Mollusca
- Class: Gastropoda
- Subclass: Caenogastropoda
- Order: Neogastropoda
- Family: Muricidae
- Subfamily: Muricopsinae
- Genus: Vitularia
- Species: V. salebrosa

Binomial name
- Vitularia salebrosa (King, 1832)

Synonyms
- Murex salebrosa King, 1832; Vitularia extensa M. Smith, 1947; Vitularia salebrosa extensa M. Smith, 1947 (original combination; junior synonym)

= Vitularia salebrosa =

Species of gastropod

Vitularia salebrosa is a species of sea snail, a marine gastropod mollusk in the family Muricidae, the murex snails or rock snails.

== Description ==
The length of the shell varies between 24 mm and 80 mm.

The shell is white or yellowish-brown, sometimes banded. The occasional varix is much thickened, being composed of a number of parallel, close laminae. The outer lip and the columella are tinged with yellow. The operculum is diamond-shaped, with two short sides above and two long ones below, the angles rounded.

== Distribution ==
V. salebrosa is found on the tropical Pacific coast of America, from Baja California to Peru. It lives under rocks in the intertidal and subtidal zones.

== Feeding ==
This species is an ectoparasite of other molluscs. Members of the species bore a hole through the host's shell and suck its blood or digestive organ (depending on the prey) over a period of months. Consistent with their suctorial feeding habit, they have a long proboscis, reduced buccal mass, and simplified digestive system compared to other Muricids.

Prey include the oyster Ostrea cf. fisheri , the limpet-like slipper shell Crucibulum spinosum, and the vermetid gastropod Tripsycha (Eualetes) tulipa.

== See also ==
- Genkaimurex varicosus, an ectoparasite of scallops in Japanese waters.^{(Herbert, 2009, citing Matsukuma, 1977)}
