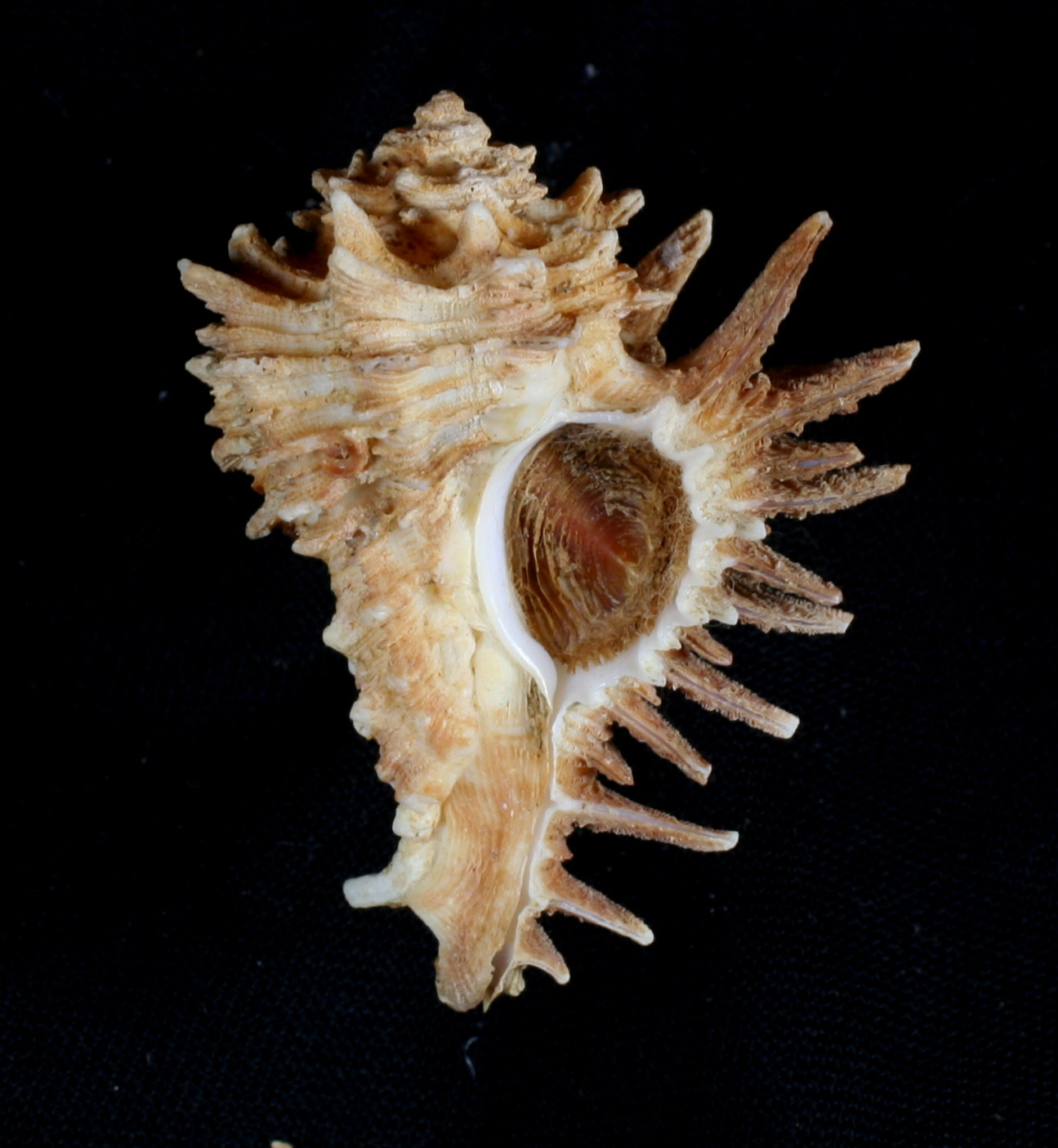
- Shell of Homalocantha oxyacantha (Broderip, 1833), measuring 49.4 mm in length, with operculum collected alive on beach at low tide at Fort Kobbe, in Panama.

Scientific classification
- Kingdom: Animalia
- Phylum: Mollusca
- Class: Gastropoda
- Subclass: Caenogastropoda
- Order: Neogastropoda
- Family: Muricidae
- Genus: Homalocantha
- Species: H. oxyacantha

Binomial name
- Homalocantha oxyacantha (Broderip, 1833)

Synonyms
- Murex oxyacantha Broderip, 1833; Murex stearnsii Dall, 1918

= Homalocantha oxyacantha =

Species of gastropod

Homalocantha oxyacantha is a species of sea snail, a marine gastropod mollusk in the family Muricidae, the murex snails or rock snails.
