= Homalocantha dovpeledi =

Scientific classification
- Kingdom: Animalia
- Phylum: Mollusca
- Class: Gastropoda
- Subclass: Caenogastropoda
- Order: Neogastropoda
- Family: Muricidae
- Genus: Homalocantha
- Species: H. dovpeledi

Binomial name
- Homalocantha dovpeledi Houart, 1982

Species of gastropod

Homalocantha dovpeledi is a species of sea snail, a marine gastropod mollusk in the family Muricidae, the murex snails or rock snails.

== Distribution ==
It is found in the Gulf of Aqaba.
