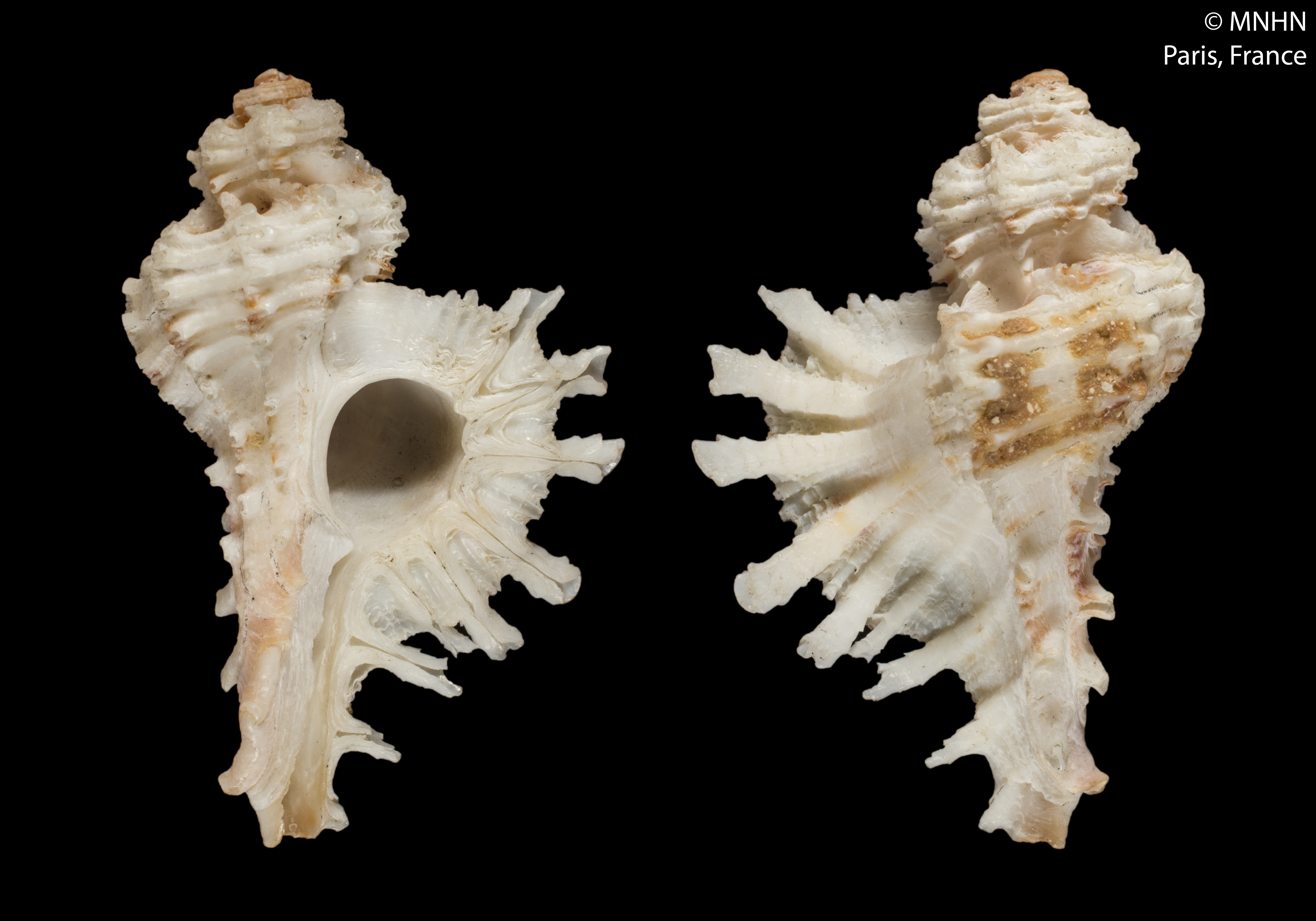
- Shell of Homalocantha lamberti (syntype at MNHN, Paris)

Scientific classification
- Kingdom: Animalia
- Phylum: Mollusca
- Class: Gastropoda
- Subclass: Caenogastropoda
- Order: Neogastropoda
- Family: Muricidae
- Genus: Homalocantha
- Species: H. lamberti

Binomial name
- Homalocantha lamberti (Poirier, 1883)

Synonyms
- Murex lamberti Poirier, 1883

= Homalocantha lamberti =

Species of gastropod

Homalocantha lamberti is a species of sea snail, a marine gastropod mollusk in the family Muricidae, also called the murex snails or rock snails.

== Distribution ==
This marine species occurs off New Caledonia.
