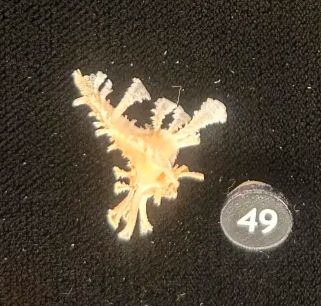
- Homalocantha dondani at the Houston Museum of Natural Science

Scientific classification
- Kingdom: Animalia
- Phylum: Mollusca
- Class: Gastropoda
- Subclass: Caenogastropoda
- Order: Neogastropoda
- Family: Muricidae
- Genus: Homalocantha
- Species: H. dondani

Binomial name
- Homalocantha dondani D'Attilio & Kosuge, 1989

= Homalocantha dondani =

Species of gastropod

Homalocantha dondani is a species of sea snail, a marine gastropod mollusk in the family Muricidae, the murex snails or rock snails.
