= Bizetiella carmen =

Scientific classification
- Kingdom: Animalia
- Phylum: Mollusca
- Class: Gastropoda
- Subclass: Caenogastropoda
- Order: Neogastropoda
- Family: Muricidae
- Genus: Bizetiella
- Species: B. carmen

Binomial name
- Bizetiella carmen (Lowe, 1935)

Synonyms
- Tritonalia carmen Lowe, 1935

Species of gastropod

Bizetiella carmen is a species of sea snail, a marine gastropod mollusk in the family Muricidae, the murex snails or rock snails.
