= Homalocantha melanamathos =

Scientific classification
- Kingdom: Animalia
- Phylum: Mollusca
- Class: Gastropoda
- Subclass: Caenogastropoda
- Order: Neogastropoda
- Family: Muricidae
- Genus: Homalocantha
- Species: H. melanamathos

Binomial name
- Homalocantha melanamathos (Gmelin, 1791)

Synonyms
- Homalocantha melanamathos f. chinii Biraghi, 1984; Murex melanamathos Gmelin, 1791; Purpura tuberosa Röding, 1798

Species of gastropod

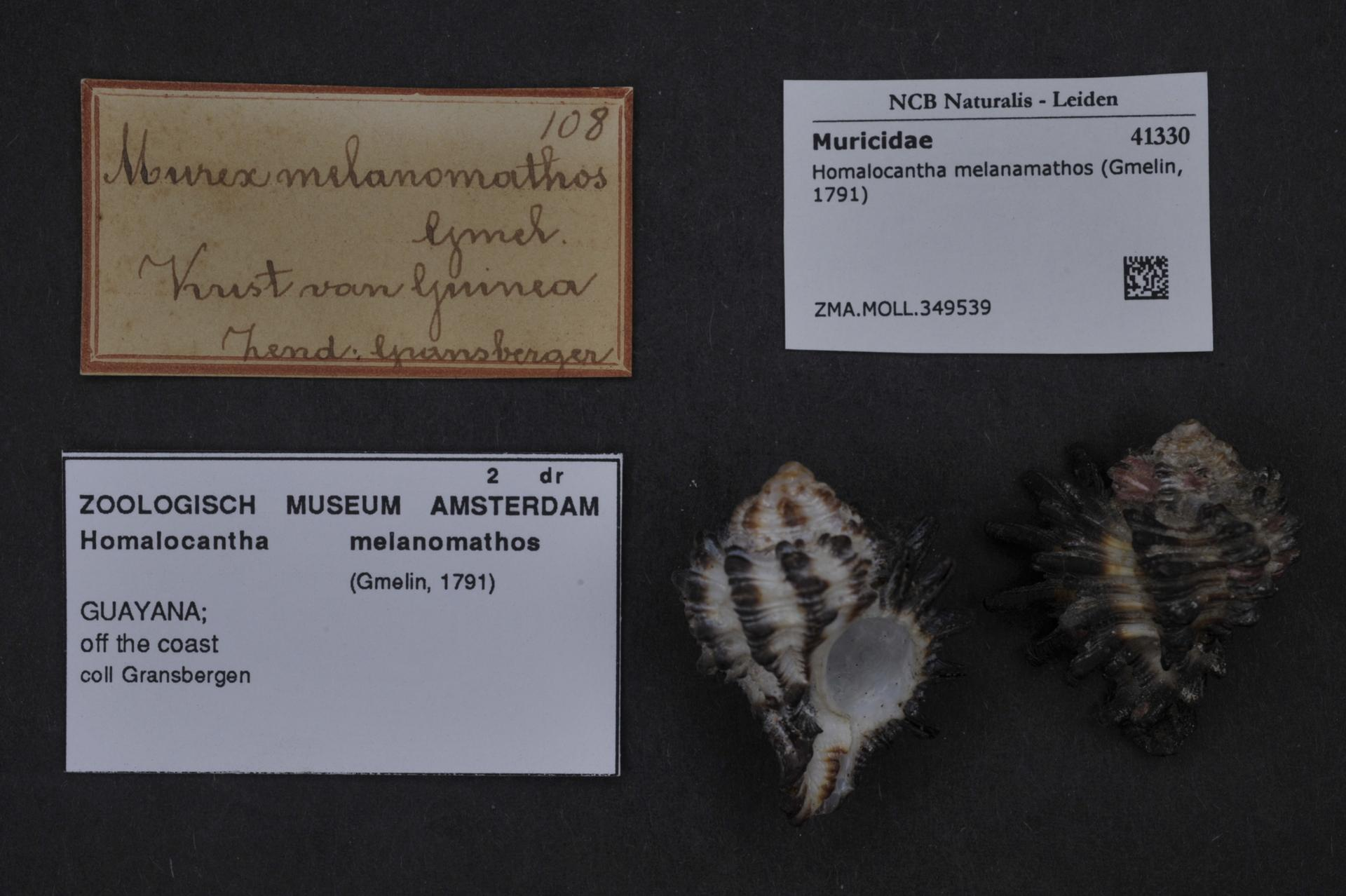
Homalocantha melanamathos (Gmelin, 1791)

Homalocantha melanamathos is a species of sea snail, a marine gastropod mollusk in the family Muricidae, the murex snails or rock snails.
