= Homalocantha pisori =

Scientific classification
- Kingdom: Animalia
- Phylum: Mollusca
- Class: Gastropoda
- Subclass: Caenogastropoda
- Order: Neogastropoda
- Family: Muricidae
- Genus: Homalocantha
- Species: H. pisori

Binomial name
- Homalocantha pisori D'Attilio & Kosuge, 1989

Species of gastropod

Homalocantha pisori is a species of sea snail, a marine gastropod mollusk in the family Muricidae, the murex snails or rock snails.

== Description ==
This species attains a size of 50 mm.

== Distribution ==
Pacific Ocean: Philippines.
