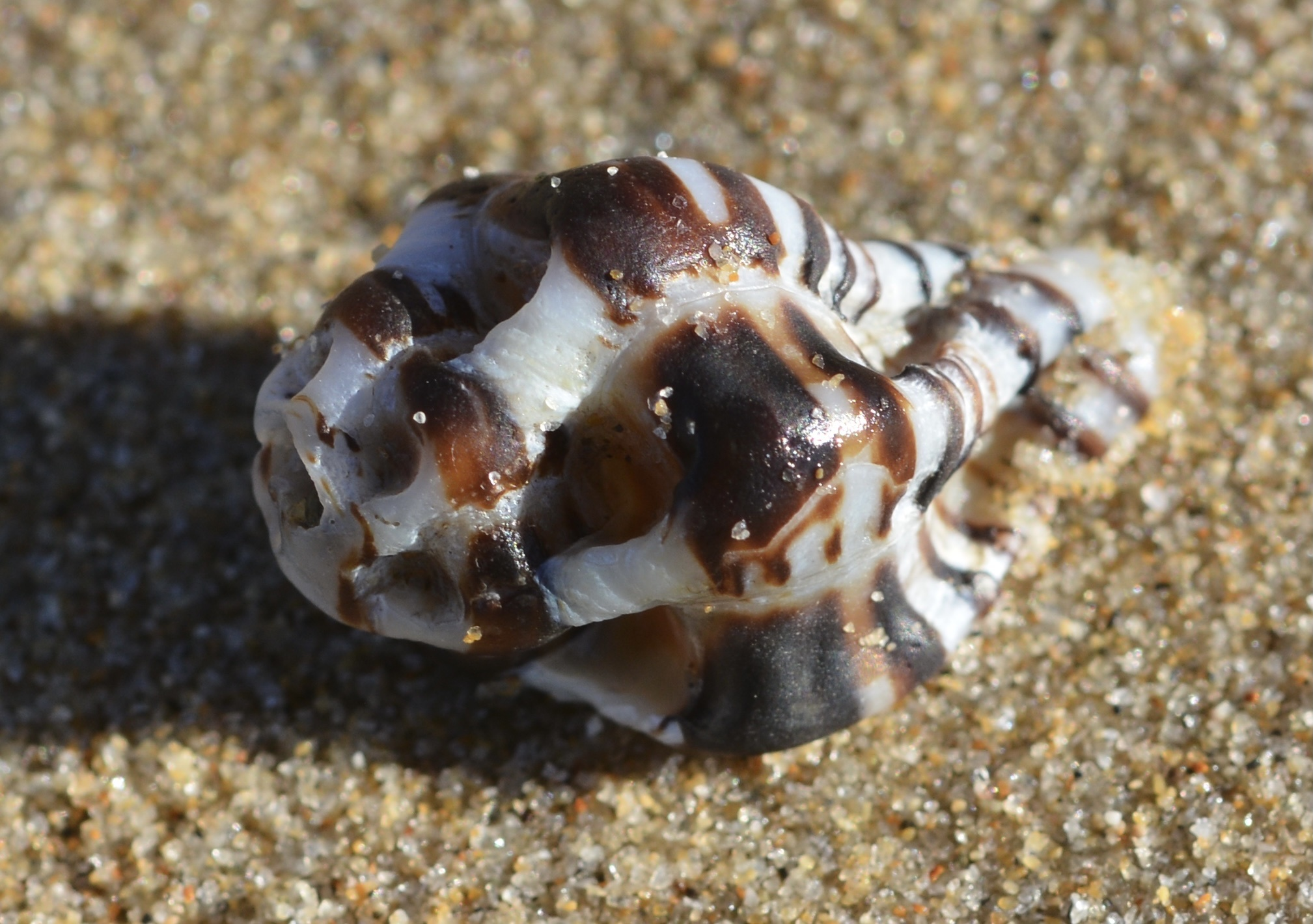

Scientific classification
- Kingdom: Animalia
- Phylum: Mollusca
- Class: Gastropoda
- Subclass: Caenogastropoda
- Order: Neogastropoda
- Family: Muricidae
- Genus: Maxwellia
- Species: M. gemma

Binomial name
- Maxwellia gemma (Sowerby, 1879)

Synonyms
- Murex gemma Sowerby, 1879 (basionym); Murexiella gemma (Sowerby, 1879)

= Maxwellia gemma =

Species of gastropod

Maxwellia gemma, commonly known as gem murex, is a species of sea snail, a marine gastropod mollusc in the family Muricidae, the murex snails or rock snails.

== Description ==
The fusiform shell is of moderate size and its length varies between 16 mm and 40 mm. The color of the shell is somewhat white with spiral bands with a reddish-brown to bluish-black color on the leading edge of each varix. The shell has a rather short, subacute, conical spire. There are five convex whorls. The body whorl is broad and spindle-shaped. Each spire whorl contains six rounded varices that are broader at the body whorl, but thinner and curved back at the stubby, top whorls and around the siphonal canal. The sutures between the whorls are deep and crossed by the oblique varices. The porcelaneous white aperture has an oval shape and has a finely dentate outer lip. The siphonal canal is rather short, almost completely closed and curved to the left at the base. There is no apparent anal canal. The inner surface of the aperture has a rippled form, reflecting the form of the ribs at the outer surface. The columella is smooth.

== Distribution ==
This species is distributed in the Pacific Ocean along California to Central Baja California, Mexico in rocky areas from the littoral zone to depths of 55 m. It can often be found in great numbers on breakwaters and close to the entrances to bays.
