= Bizetiella shaskyi =

Scientific classification
- Kingdom: Animalia
- Phylum: Mollusca
- Class: Gastropoda
- Subclass: Caenogastropoda
- Order: Neogastropoda
- Family: Muricidae
- Genus: Bizetiella
- Species: B. shaskyi

Binomial name
- Bizetiella shaskyi Radwin & D'Attilio, 1972

Species of gastropod

Bizetiella shaskyi is a species of sea snail, a marine gastropod mollusk in the family Muricidae, the murex snails or rock snails.
