= Bizetiella =

Scientific classification
- Kingdom: Animalia
- Phylum: Mollusca
- Class: Gastropoda
- Subclass: Caenogastropoda
- Order: Neogastropoda
- Family: Muricidae
- Subfamily: Muricopsinae
- Genus: Bizetiella; Radwin & D'Attilio, 1972

Genus of gastropods

Bizetiella is a genus of sea snails, marine gastropod mollusks in the family Muricidae, the murex snails or rock snails.

== Species ==
Species within the genus Bizetiella include:

- Bizetiella carmen (Lowe, 1935)
- Bizetiella micaela Radwin & D'Attilio, 1972
- Bizetiella shaskyi Radwin & D'Attilio, 1972
