= Subpterynotus exquisitus =

Scientific classification
- Kingdom: Animalia
- Phylum: Mollusca
- Class: Gastropoda
- Subclass: Caenogastropoda
- Order: Neogastropoda
- Family: Muricidae
- Genus: Subpterynotus
- Species: S. exquisitus

Binomial name
- Subpterynotus exquisitus (Sowerby, 1904)

Synonyms
- Murex exquisitus Sowerby, 1904

Species of gastropod

Subpterynotus exquisitus is a species of sea snail, a marine gastropod mollusk in the family Muricidae, the murex snails or rock snails.
