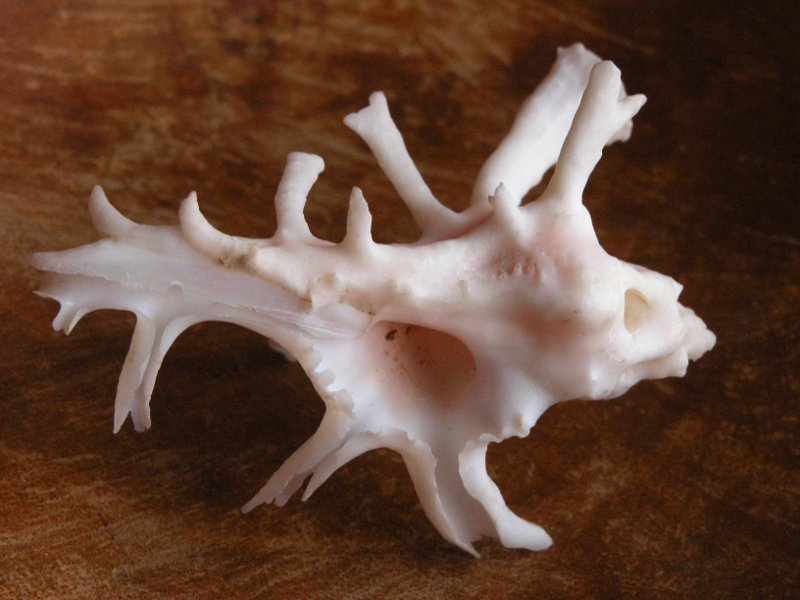
- a shell of Homalocantha zamboi

Scientific classification
- Kingdom: Animalia
- Phylum: Mollusca
- Class: Gastropoda
- Subclass: Caenogastropoda
- Order: Neogastropoda
- Superfamily: Muricoidea
- Family: Muricidae
- Subfamily: Muricopsinae
- Genus: Homalocantha; Mörch, 1852

Type species
- Murex scorpio Linnaeus, 1758

= Homalocantha =

Genus of gastropods

Homalocantha is a genus of sea snails, marine gastropod mollusks in the family Muricidae, the murex snails or rock snails.

The placement of this genus in the subfamily Muricopsinae is doubtful, but the radula characters make it belong definitely in the family Muricidae.

== Species ==
Species within the genus Homalocantha include:

- Homalocantha anatomica (Perry, 1811)
- Homalocantha anomaliae Kosuge, 1979
- Homalocantha digitata (Sowerby II, 1841)
- Homalocantha dondani D'Attilio & Kosuge, 1989
- Homalocantha dovpeledi Houart, 1982
- Homalocantha elatensis Heiman & Mienis, 2009
- Homalocantha granpoderi Merle & Garrigues, 2011
- Homalocantha lamberti (Poirier, 1883)
- Homalocantha melanamathos (Gmelin, 1791)
- Homalocantha ninae Merle & Garrigues, 2011
- Homalocantha nivea Granpoder & Garrigues, 2014
- Homalocantha oxyacantha (Broderip, 1833)
- Homalocantha pele (Pilsbry, 1918)
- Homalocantha pisori D'Attilio & Kosuge, 1989
- Homalocantha scorpio (Linnaeus, 1758)
- Homalocantha secunda (Lamarck, 1822)
- Homalocantha tortua (Broderip in Sowerby, 1834)
- Homalocantha vicdani D'Attilio & Kosuge, 1989
- Homalocantha zamboi (Burch & Burch, 1960)

Species brought into synonymy

- Homalocantha echiniformis Shikama, 1978: synonym of Favartia balteata (G. B. Sowerby II, 1841) (synonym)
- Homalocantha fauroti Jousseaume, 1888: synonym of Homalocantha anatomica (Perry, 1811)
- Homalocantha rota (Mawe, 1823): synonym of Homalocantha anatomica (Perry, 1811)
