= Genkaimurex =

Scientific classification
- Kingdom: Animalia
- Phylum: Mollusca
- Class: Gastropoda
- Subclass: Caenogastropoda
- Order: Neogastropoda
- Family: Muricidae
- Subfamily: Ocenebrinae
- Genus: Genkaimurex; Kuroda, 1953

Genus of sea snails

Genkaimurex is a genus of sea snails, marine gastropod mollusks in the family Muricidae, the murex snails or rock snails.

== Species ==
Species within the genus Genkaimurex include:

- Genkaimurex fimbriatulus (A. Adams, 1863)
- Genkaimurex monopterus (Pilsbry, 1904)
- Genkaimurex varicosus (Kuroda, 1953)
