= Homalocantha anomaliae =

Scientific classification
- Kingdom: Animalia
- Phylum: Mollusca
- Class: Gastropoda
- Subclass: Caenogastropoda
- Order: Neogastropoda
- Family: Muricidae
- Genus: Homalocantha
- Species: H. anomaliae

Binomial name
- Homalocantha anomaliae Kosuge, 1979

Species of gastropod

Homalocantha anomaliae is a species of sea snail, a marine gastropod mollusk in the family Muricidae, the murex snails or rock snails.
