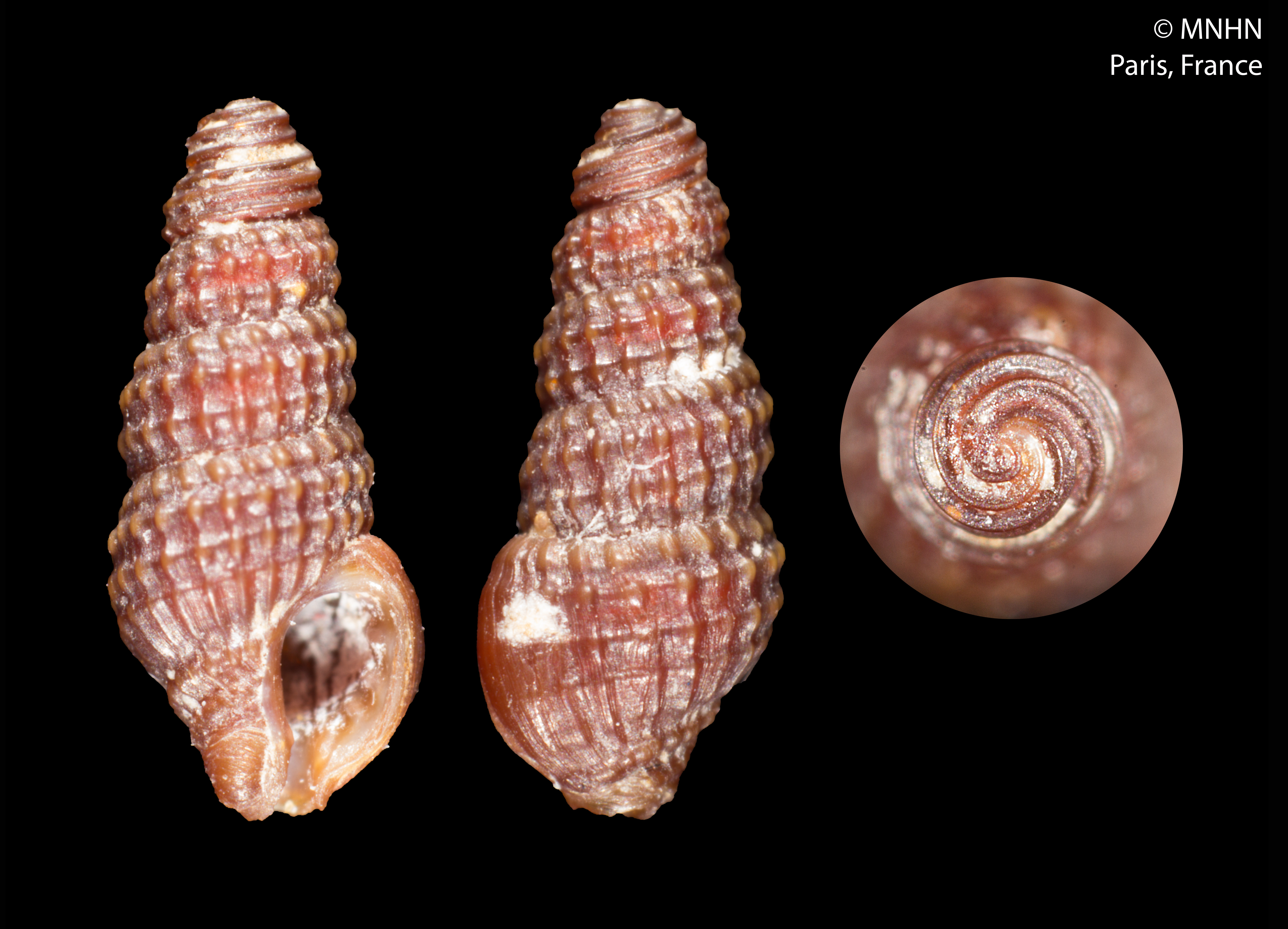
- Shell of Pradoxa confirmata (paratype at MNHN, Paris)

Conservation status
- Data Deficient (IUCN 2.3)

Scientific classification
- Kingdom: Animalia
- Phylum: Mollusca
- Class: Gastropoda
- Subclass: Caenogastropoda
- Order: Neogastropoda
- Family: Muricidae
- Genus: Pradoxa
- Species: P. confirmata

Binomial name
- Pradoxa confirmata (Fernandes & Rolán, 1990)

Synonyms
- Paradoxa confirmata Fernandes & Rolán, 1990

= Pradoxa confirmata =

Species of gastropod

Pradoxa confirmata is a species of sea snail, a marine gastropod mollusk in the family Muricidae, the murex snails or rock snails.

== Distribution ==
It occurs off the islands of São Tomé and Príncipe.
