= Maxwellia angermeyerae =

Scientific classification
- Kingdom: Animalia
- Phylum: Mollusca
- Class: Gastropoda
- Subclass: Caenogastropoda
- Order: Neogastropoda
- Family: Muricidae
- Genus: Maxwellia
- Species: M. angermeyerae

Binomial name
- Maxwellia angermeyerae (Emerson & D'Attilio, 1965)

Synonyms
- Aspella (Favartia) angermeyerae Emerson & D'Attilio, 1965; Murexiella angermeyerae (Emerson & D'Attilio, 1965)

Species of gastropod

Maxwellia angermeyerae is a species of sea snail, a marine gastropod mollusc in the family Muricidae, the murex snails or rock snails.

== Description ==
The size of the subfusiform shell varies between 14 mm and 25 mm. The shell surface is chalky white, crossed by horizontal purple to black streaks on the seven rounded axial ribs, that are twisted and swollen at the base of the body whorl. There are also eight or nine spiral riblets. The low spire is globose and consists of two and a half whorls, sitting op top of four body whorls. As each subsequent whorls rises above the shoulder margin of the previous whorl, the sutures are not visible. The body whorl is large and almost spindle-shaped. The ovate aperture has a small anal canal that point slightly backwards. The outer lip is crenulate, but has a smooth inner surface. The columellar lip is callused. The siphonal canal is moderately long and, typical for this genus, fused above, almost sealed below and pointing to the left at its base.

== Distribution ==
This species is distributed in the Pacific Ocean along the Galápagos Islands.
