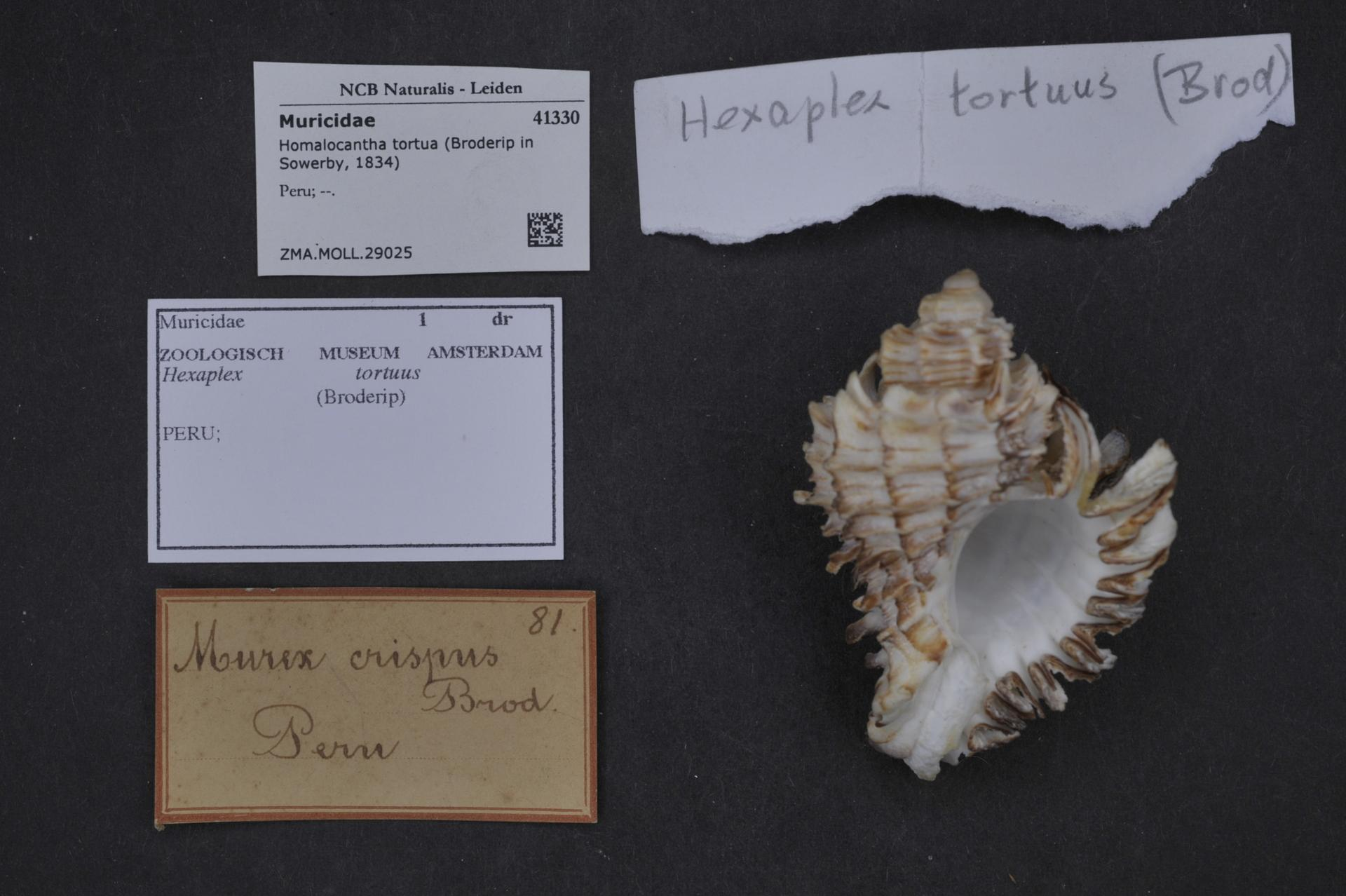
- Homalocantha tortua

Scientific classification
- Kingdom: Animalia
- Phylum: Mollusca
- Class: Gastropoda
- Subclass: Caenogastropoda
- Order: Neogastropoda
- Family: Muricidae
- Genus: Homalocantha
- Species: H. tortua

Binomial name
- Homalocantha tortua (Broderip in Sowerby, 1834)

Synonyms
- Murex crispus Broderip, 1833; Murex multicrispatus Dunker, 1869; Murex tortua Broderip in Sowerby, 1834

= Homalocantha tortua =

Species of gastropod

Homalocantha tortua is a species of sea snail, a marine gastropod mollusc in the family Muricidae, the murex snails or rock snails.
