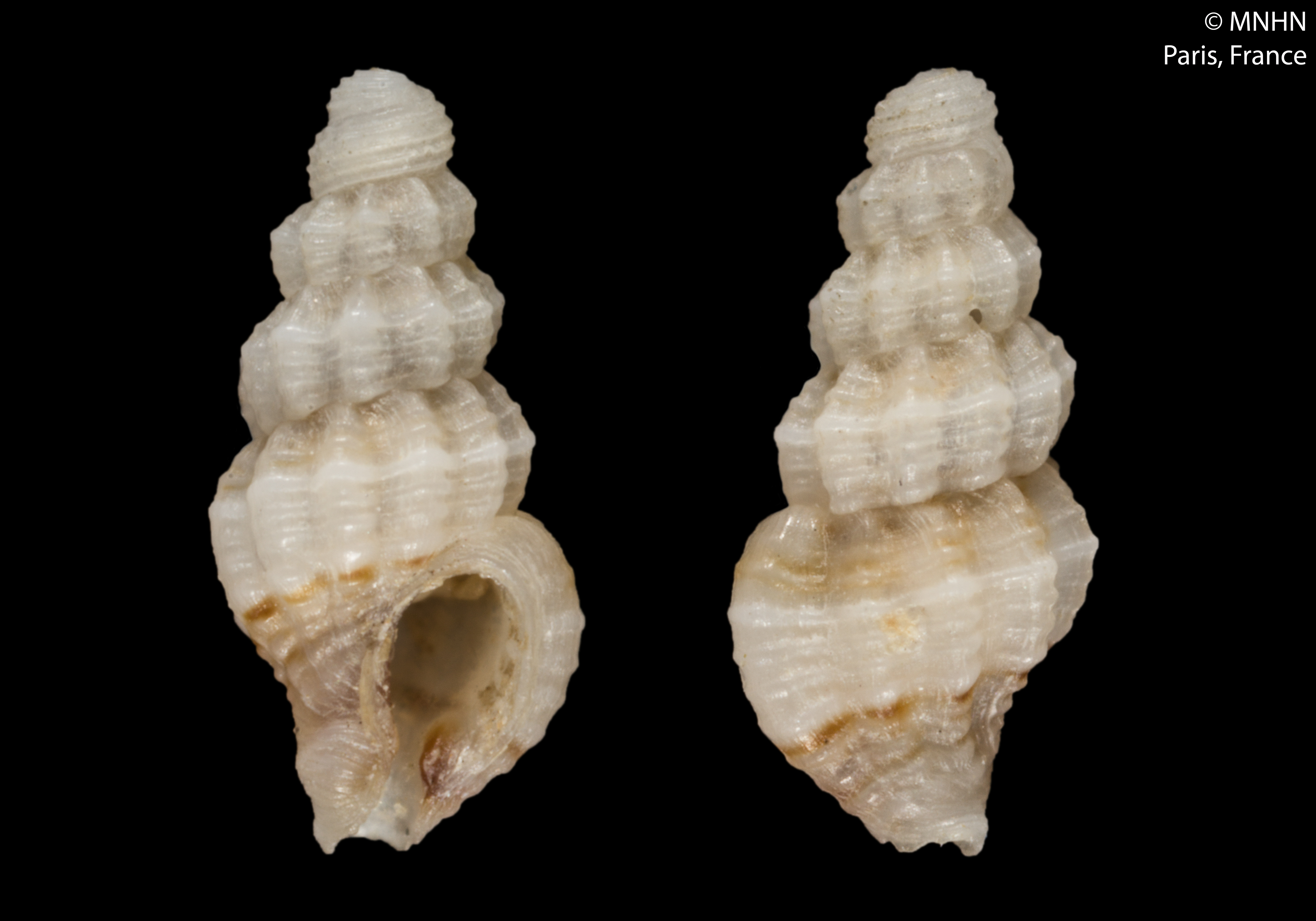
- Shell of Pradoxa urdambideli (holotype at MNHN, Paris)

Scientific classification
- Kingdom: Animalia
- Phylum: Mollusca
- Class: Gastropoda
- Subclass: Caenogastropoda
- Order: Neogastropoda
- Family: Muricidae
- Genus: Pradoxa
- Species: P. urdambideli

Binomial name
- Pradoxa urdambideli Houart & Rolán, 2012

= Pradoxa urdambideli =

Species of gastropod

Pradoxa urdambideli is a species of sea snail, a marine gastropod mollusc in the family Muricidae, the dove snails.

== Description ==
The length of the shell attains 3.3 mm.

== Distribution ==
The species occurs off the island of São Tomé, São Tomé and Príncipe.
