= Homalocantha digitata =

Scientific classification
- Kingdom: Animalia
- Phylum: Mollusca
- Class: Gastropoda
- Subclass: Caenogastropoda
- Order: Neogastropoda
- Family: Muricidae
- Genus: Homalocantha
- Species: H. digitata

Binomial name
- Homalocantha digitata (Sowerby, 1841)

Synonyms
- Murex digitatus Sowerby, 1841; Murex varicosus Sowerby, 1834

Species of gastropod

Homalocantha digitata is a species of sea snail, a marine gastropod mollusk in the family Muricidae, the murex snails or rock snails.
