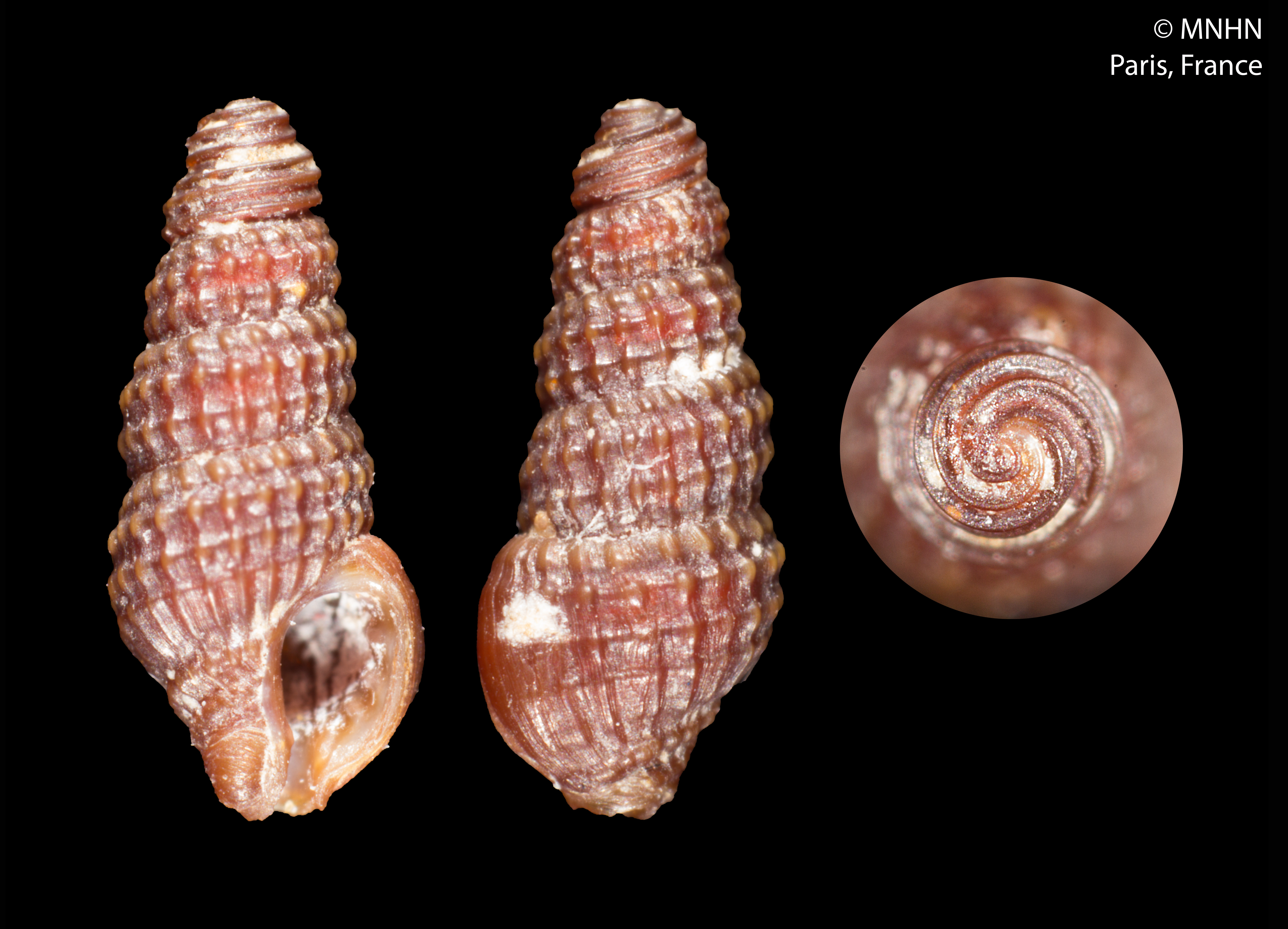
- Pradoxa confirmata

Scientific classification
- Kingdom: Animalia
- Phylum: Mollusca
- Class: Gastropoda
- Subclass: Caenogastropoda
- Order: Neogastropoda
- Family: Muricidae
- Subfamily: Muricopsinae
- Genus: Pradoxa; Fernandes & Rolán, 1993

Type species
- Paradoxa confirmata F. Fernandes & Rolán, 1990

Synonyms
- Paradoxa Fernandes & Rolán, 1990 (Junior homonym of Paradoxa Marshall, 1894); Paradoxon Fernandes & Rolán, 1990 (Replacement name for Paradoxa Fernandes & Rolán, 1990 non Marshall, 1894, but itself a junior homonym of Paradoxon Fleutiaux, 1903.)

= Pradoxa =

Genus of gastropods

Pradoxa is a genus of sea snails, marine gastropod mollusks in the subfamily Muricopsinae of the family Muricidae, the murex snails or rock snails.

== Species ==
Species within the genus Pradoxa include:

- Pradoxa confirmata (Fernandes & Rolán, 1990)
- Pradoxa gorii Houart & Rolán, 2012
- Pradoxa thomensis (Fernandes & Rolan, 1990)
- Pradoxa urdambideli Houart & Rolán, 2012
