= Homalocantha pele =

Scientific classification
- Kingdom: Animalia
- Phylum: Mollusca
- Class: Gastropoda
- Subclass: Caenogastropoda
- Order: Neogastropoda
- Family: Muricidae
- Genus: Homalocantha
- Species: H. pele

Binomial name
- Homalocantha pele (Pilsbry, 1918)

Synonyms
- Murex pele Pilsbry, 1918

Species of gastropod

Homalocantha pele is a species of sea snail, a marine gastropod mollusk in the family Muricidae, the murex snails or rock snails.

== Description ==
Shell size 40-45 mm.

== Distribution ==
Pacific Ocean: Hawaii: lives on rocks and algae substrate, at 15 m. depth.
