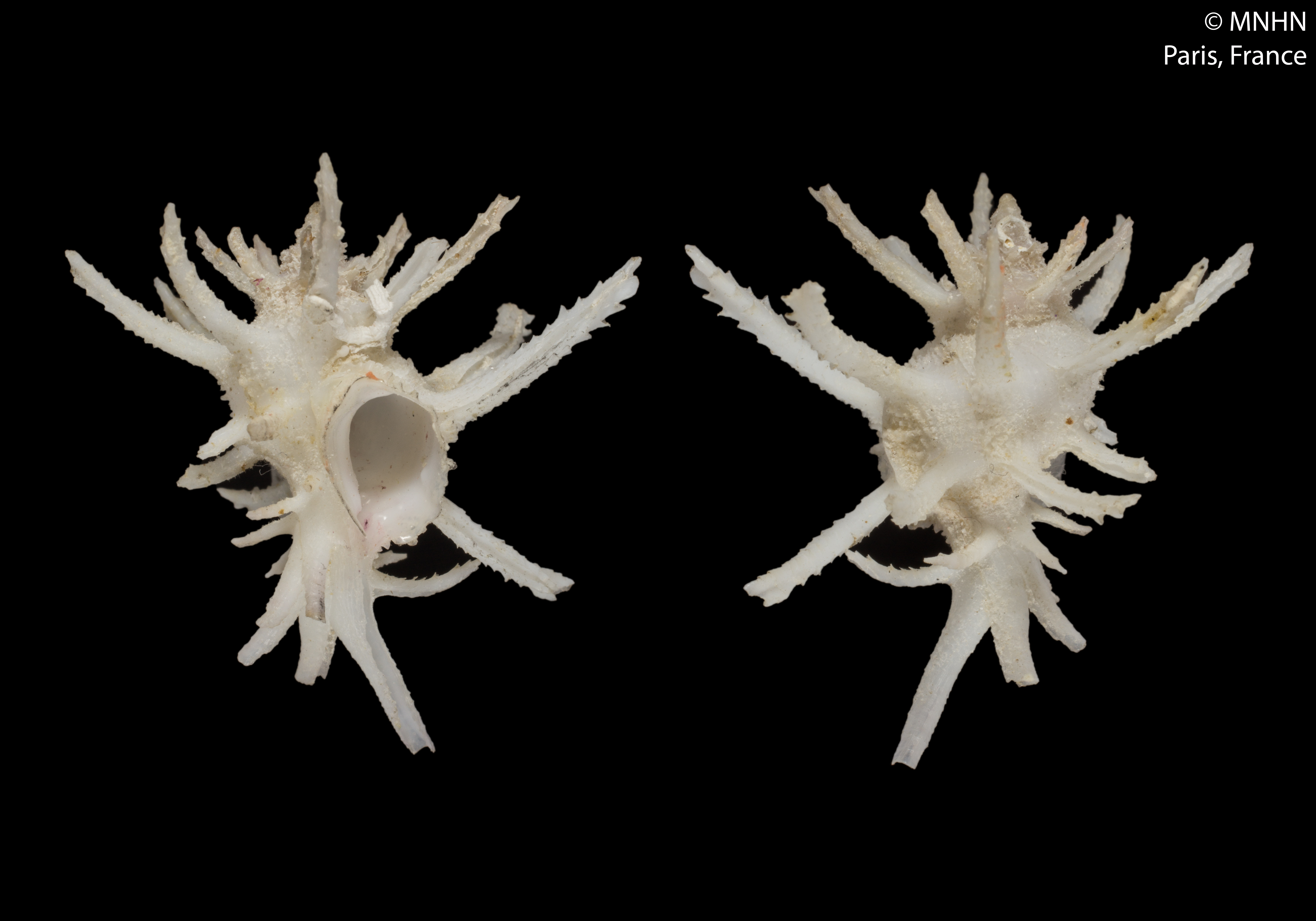
- Shell of Xastilia kosugei (holotype at MNHN, Paris)

Scientific classification
- Kingdom: Animalia
- Phylum: Mollusca
- Class: Gastropoda
- Subclass: Caenogastropoda
- Order: Neogastropoda
- Superfamily: Muricoidea
- Family: Muricidae
- Subfamily: Muricopsinae
- Genus: Xastilia; Bouchet & Houart, 1994

Type species
- Xastilia kosugei Bouchet & Houart, 1994

= Xastilia =

Genus of gastropods

Xastilia is a genus of sea snails, marine gastropod mollusks in the subfamily Muricopsinae of the family Muricidae, the murex snails or rock snails.

== Species ==
Species within the genus Xastilia include:

- Xastilia kosugei Bouchet & Houart, 1994
