= Maxwellia santarosana =

Scientific classification
- Kingdom: Animalia
- Phylum: Mollusca
- Class: Gastropoda
- Subclass: Caenogastropoda
- Order: Neogastropoda
- Family: Muricidae
- Genus: Maxwellia
- Species: M. santarosana

Binomial name
- Maxwellia santarosana (Dall, 1905)

Synonyms
- Murex fimbriatus A. Adams, 1854 (not Brocchi); Murex santarosana Dall, 1905 (basionym); Murexiella santarosana (Dall, 1905)

Species of gastropod

Maxwellia santarosana, common name the "Santa Rosa murex" is a species of small predatory sea snail, a marine gastropod mollusk in the family Muricidae, the rock snails.

== Description ==
The size of the fusiform, varicose shell varies between 25 mm and 42 mm. The spire is higher than the other species in this genus and consists of six whorls. The hollow sutures are visible when not hidden by the subsequent whorl. The body whorl is rather broad and spindle-shaped. The ovate aperture has a barely perceptible anal canal. The outer lip is finely crenulate but its inner surface is smooth. The columellar lip is smooth and callused. The siphonal canal is of moderate length and, as typical for this genus, fused on top, almost sealed below and pointing to the left at its base. the body whorl shows six prominent varices, extending from the shoulder of the preceding whorl to the end of the siphonal canal. The shell sculpture shows major and minor cords.

The shell is white with the edge of each varix ochre-brown.

== Distribution ==
This species is found in the Eastern Pacific Ocean, from California to Baja California.
