= Subpterynotus tatei =

Scientific classification
- Kingdom: Animalia
- Phylum: Mollusca
- Class: Gastropoda
- Subclass: Caenogastropoda
- Order: Neogastropoda
- Family: Muricidae
- Genus: Subpterynotus
- Species: S. tatei

Binomial name
- Subpterynotus tatei (Verco, 1895)

Synonyms
- Murex tatei Verco, 1895

Species of gastropod

Subpterynotus tatei is a species of sea snail, a marine gastropod mollusk in the family Muricidae, the murex snails or rock snails.
