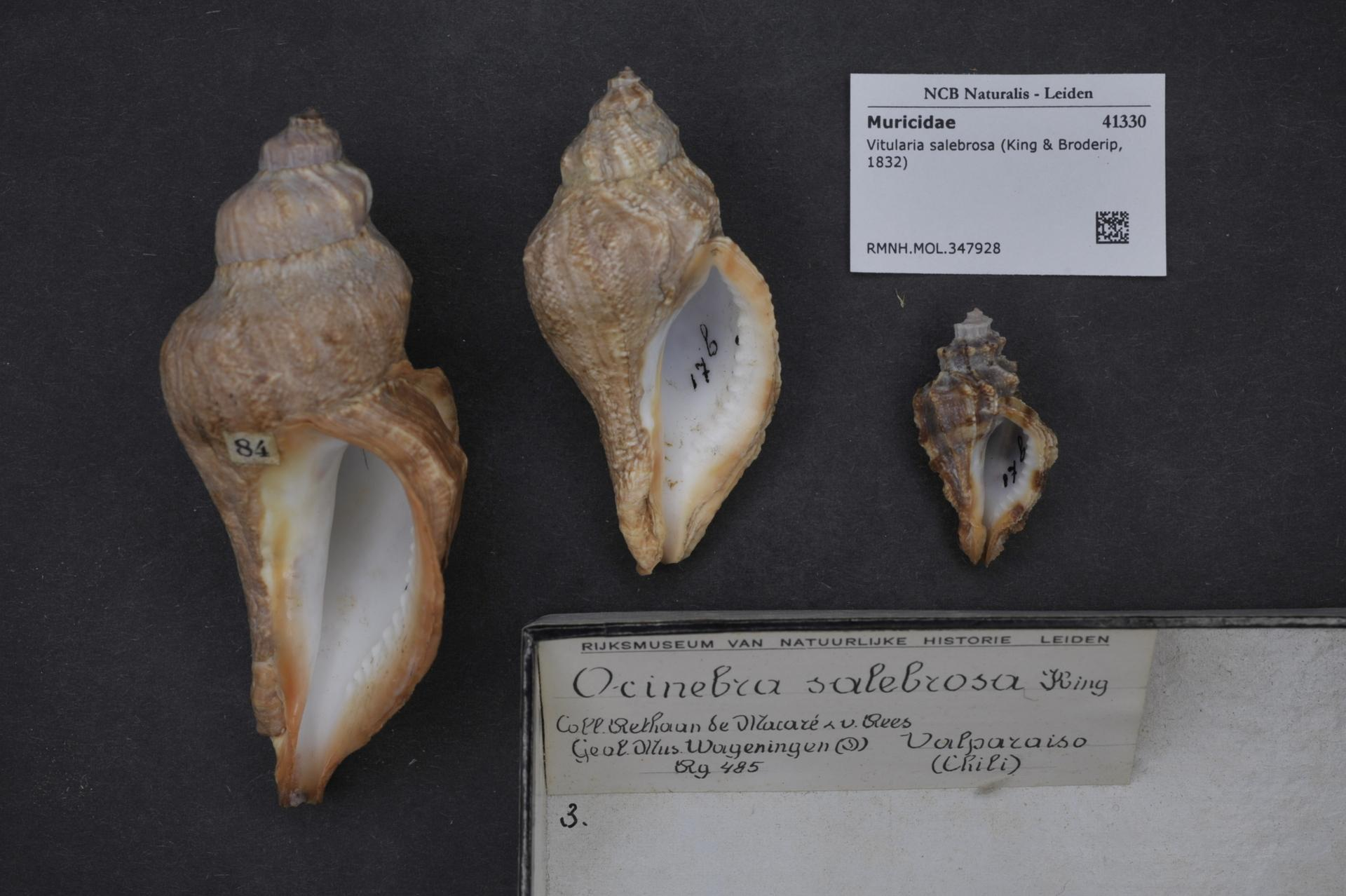
- Vitularia salebrosa

Scientific classification
- Kingdom: Animalia
- Phylum: Mollusca
- Class: Gastropoda
- Subclass: Caenogastropoda
- Order: Neogastropoda
- Superfamily: Muricoidea
- Family: Muricidae
- Subfamily: Muricopsinae
- Genus: Vitularia; Swainson, 1840

Type species
- Murex miliaris Gmelin, 1791

Synonyms
- Transtrafer Iredale, 1929; Vitulina Swainson, 1840 (alternative original spelling)

= Vitularia =

Genus of gastropods

Vitularia is a genus of sea snails, marine gastropod mollusks in the family Muricidae, the murex snails or rock snails.

== Distribution ==
These marine species occur in the Indo-west Pacific and eastern Pacific; also off Australia (Queensland, Western Australia)

== Species ==
Species within the genus Vitularia include:

- Vitularia crenifer (Montrouzier, 1861)
- † Vitularia dominicana E. H. Vokes, 1989
- † Vitularia linguabovis (Basterot, 1825)
- Vitularia miliaris (Gmelin, 1791)
- Vitularia minima Bozzetti, 2006
- Vitularia salebrosa (King & Broderip, 1832)
- Vitularia sandwicensis (Pease, 1861)
- Vitularia triangularis Bozzetti, 2009

Synonyms

- Vitularia asiatica Kira, 1962: synonym of Vitularia miliaris (Gmelin, 1791)
- Vitularia aspera Baird, 1863: synonym of Paciocinebrina lurida (Middendorff, 1848)
- Vitularia candida H. Adams & A. Adams, 1864: synonym of Nucella wahlbergi (Krauss, 1848)
- † Vitularia crassicostata (Deshayes, 1835): synonym of † Lyropurpura crassicostata (Deshayes, 1835) (superseded combination)
- † Vitularia curtansata Tate, 1888 †: synonym of † Urosalpinx curtansata (Tate, 1888)
- Vitularia extensa M. Smith, 1947: synonym of Vitularia salebrosa (P. P. King, 1832)
- Vitularia tuberculata Swainson, 1840: synonym of Vitularia miliaris (Gmelin, 1791)
