= Genkaimurex monopterus =

Scientific classification
- Kingdom: Animalia
- Phylum: Mollusca
- Class: Gastropoda
- Subclass: Caenogastropoda
- Order: Neogastropoda
- Family: Muricidae
- Genus: Genkaimurex
- Species: G. monopterus

Binomial name
- Genkaimurex monopterus (Pilsbry, 1904)

Synonyms
- Ocinebra monoptera Pilsbry, 1904

Species of gastropod

Genkaimurex monopterus is a species of sea snail, a marine gastropod mollusk in the family Muricidae, the murex snails or rock snails.
