= Genkaimurex fimbriatulus =

Scientific classification
- Kingdom: Animalia
- Phylum: Mollusca
- Class: Gastropoda
- Subclass: Caenogastropoda
- Order: Neogastropoda
- Family: Muricidae
- Genus: Genkaimurex
- Species: G. fimbriatulus

Binomial name
- Genkaimurex fimbriatulus (A. Adams, 1863)

Synonyms
- Murex wakasanus Nomura & Niino, 1940; Trophon fimbriatulum A. Adams, 1863

Species of gastropod

Genkaimurex fimbriatulus is a species of sea snail, a marine gastropod mollusk in the family Muricidae, the murex snails or rock snails.
