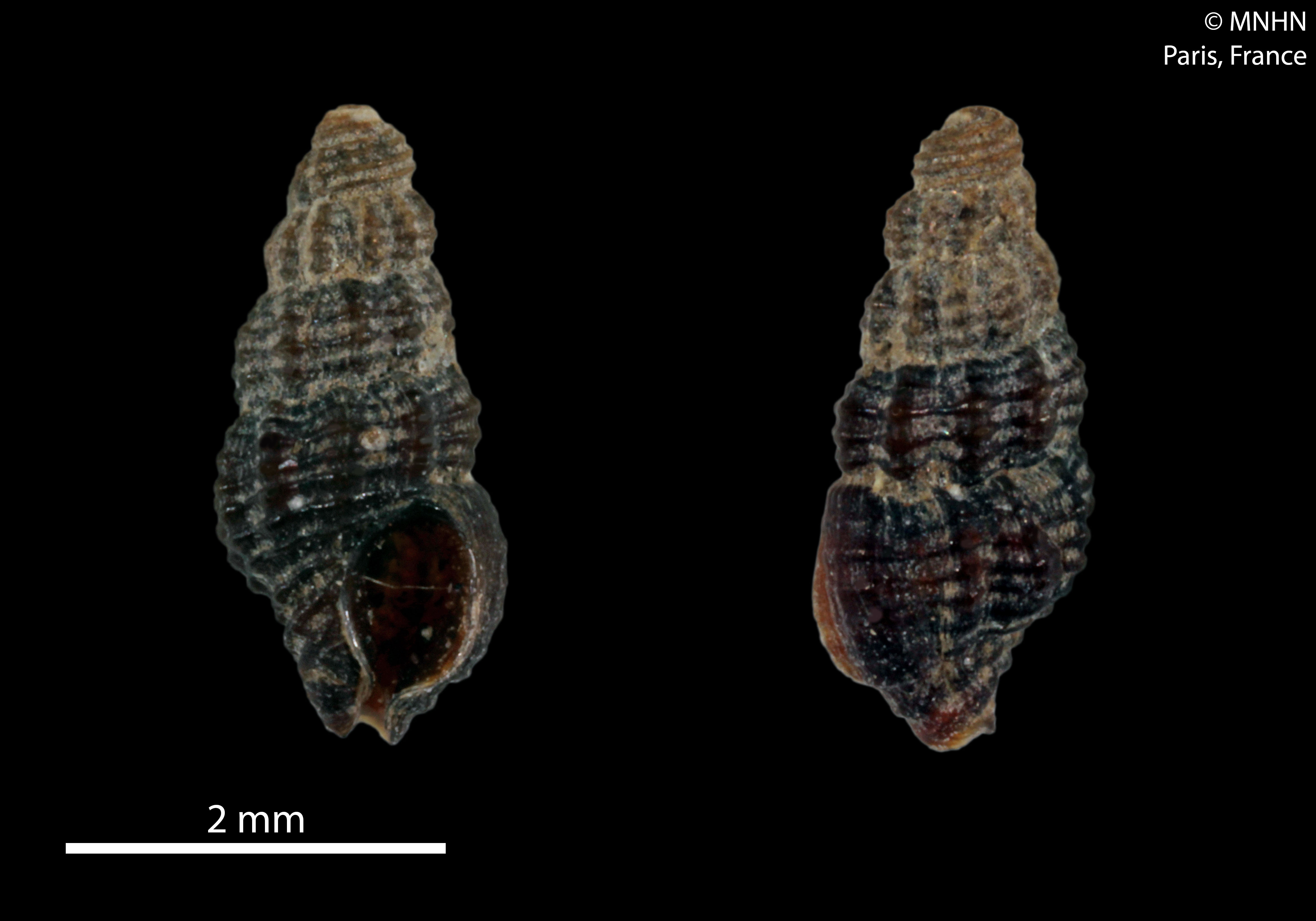
- Shell of Pradoxa thomensis (paratype at MNHN, Paris)

Conservation status
- Data Deficient (IUCN 2.3)

Scientific classification
- Kingdom: Animalia
- Phylum: Mollusca
- Class: Gastropoda
- Subclass: Caenogastropoda
- Order: Neogastropoda
- Family: Muricidae
- Genus: Pradoxa
- Species: P. thomensis

Binomial name
- Pradoxa thomensis (Fernandes & Rolan, 1990)

Synonyms
- Paradoxa thomensis Fernandes & Rolan, 1990

= Pradoxa thomensis =

Species of gastropod

Pradoxa thomensis is a species of sea snail, a marine gastropod mollusk in the family Muricidae, the murex snails or rock snails.

The specific name thomensis refers to the island of São Tomé, where the species is found.

== Distribution ==
Pradoxa thomensis occurs on the islands of São Tomé and Príncipe.
