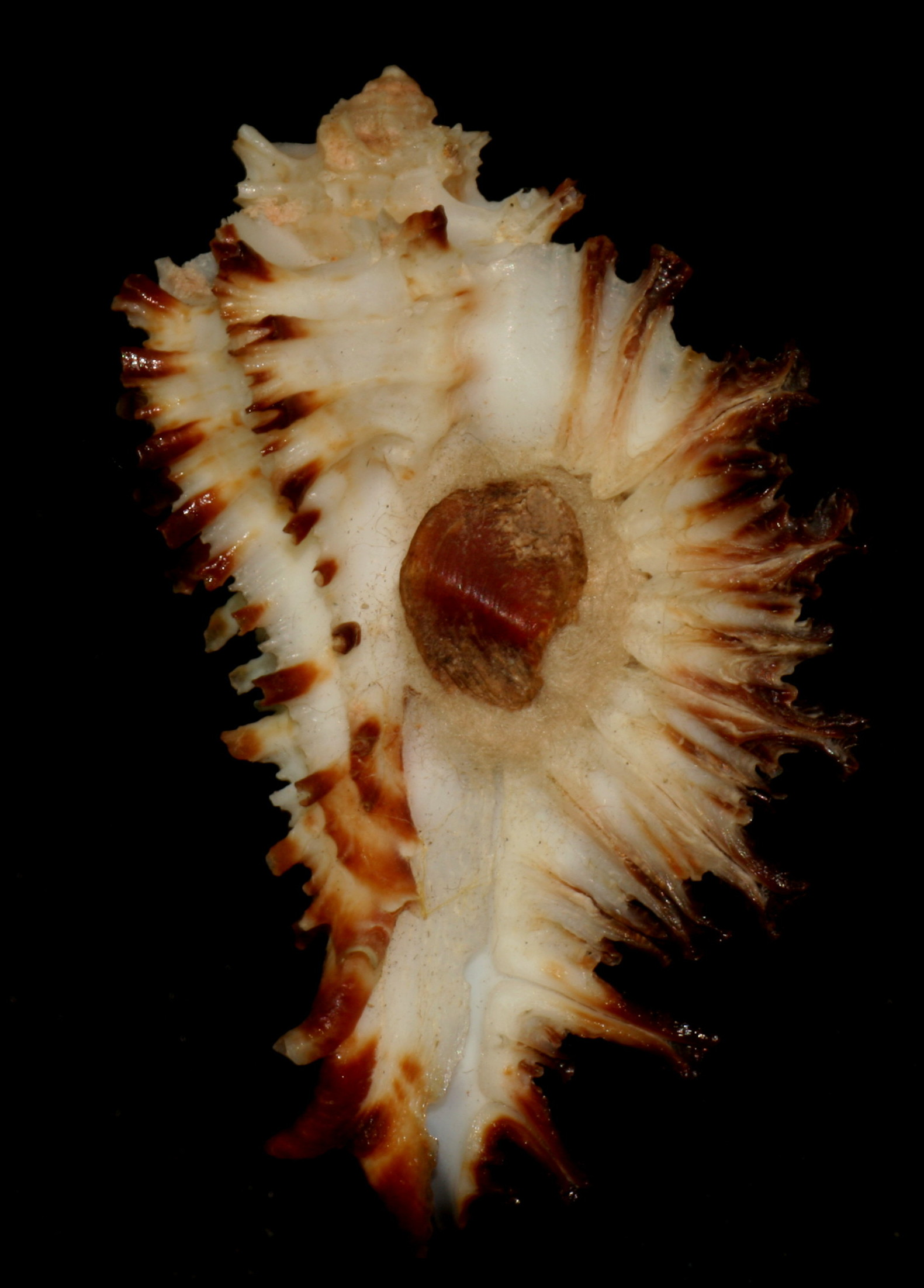
- Shell of Homalocantha secunda (Lamarck, 1822), with operculum, 40.2 mm in length, by scuba diver at 100 ft., off Rameswaram, India

Scientific classification
- Kingdom: Animalia
- Phylum: Mollusca
- Class: Gastropoda
- Subclass: Caenogastropoda
- Order: Neogastropoda
- Family: Muricidae
- Genus: Homalocantha
- Species: H. secunda

Binomial name
- Homalocantha secunda (Lamarck, 1822)

Synonyms
- Murex secundus Lamarck, 1822

= Homalocantha secunda =

Species of gastropod

Homalocantha secunda is a species of sea snail, a marine gastropod mollusc in the family Muricidae, the murex snails or rock snails.
