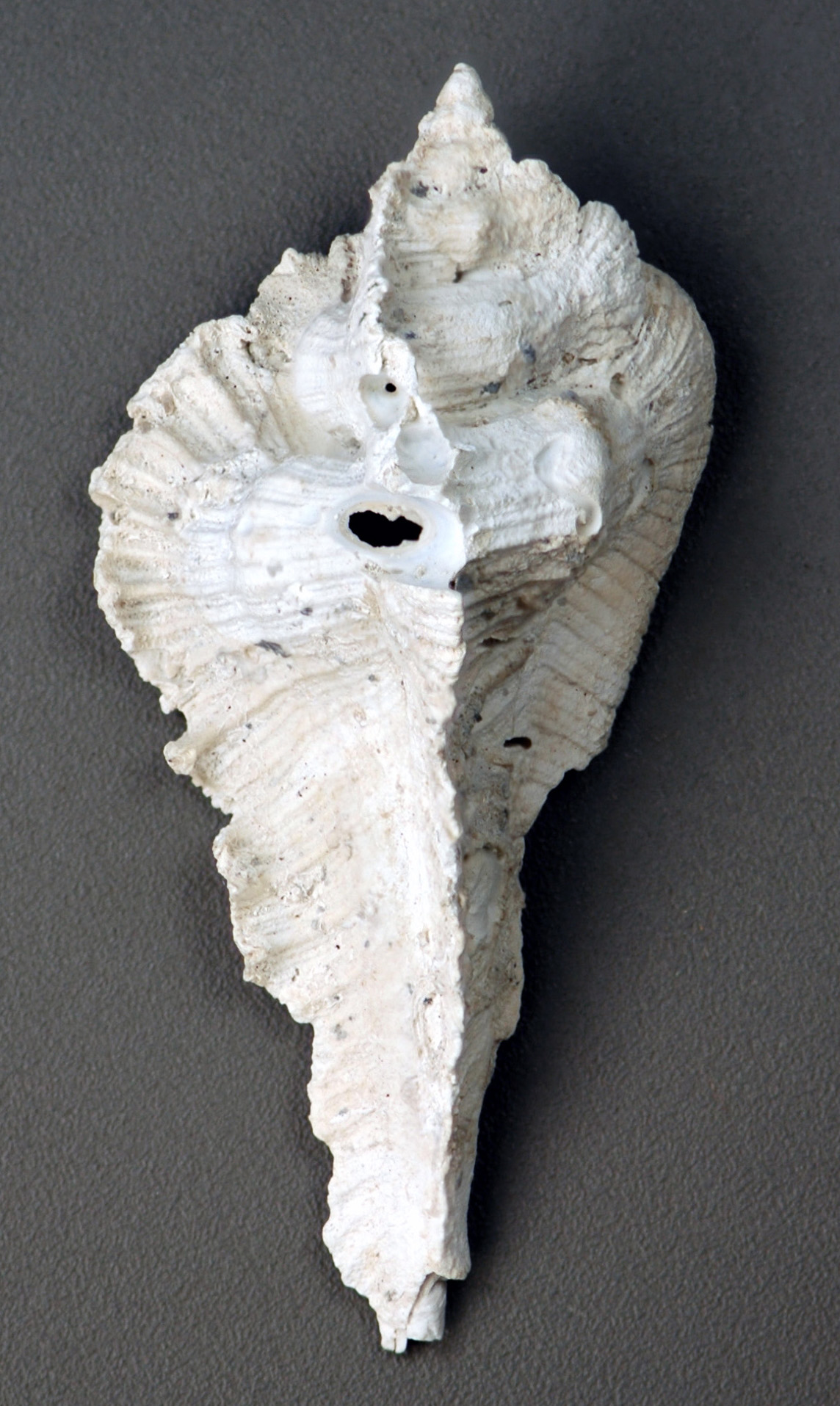

Scientific classification
- Kingdom: Animalia
- Phylum: Mollusca
- Class: Gastropoda
- Subclass: Caenogastropoda
- Order: Neogastropoda
- Family: Muricidae
- Subfamily: Muricopsinae
- Genus: Subpterynotus; Olsson & Harbison, 1953

= Subpterynotus =

Genus of gastropods

Subpterynotus is a genus of sea snails, marine gastropod mollusks in the family Muricidae, the murex snails or rock snails.

== Species ==
Species within the genus Subpterynotus include:

- Subpterynotus exquisitus (Sowerby, 1904)
- Subpterynotus tatei (Verco, 1895)
