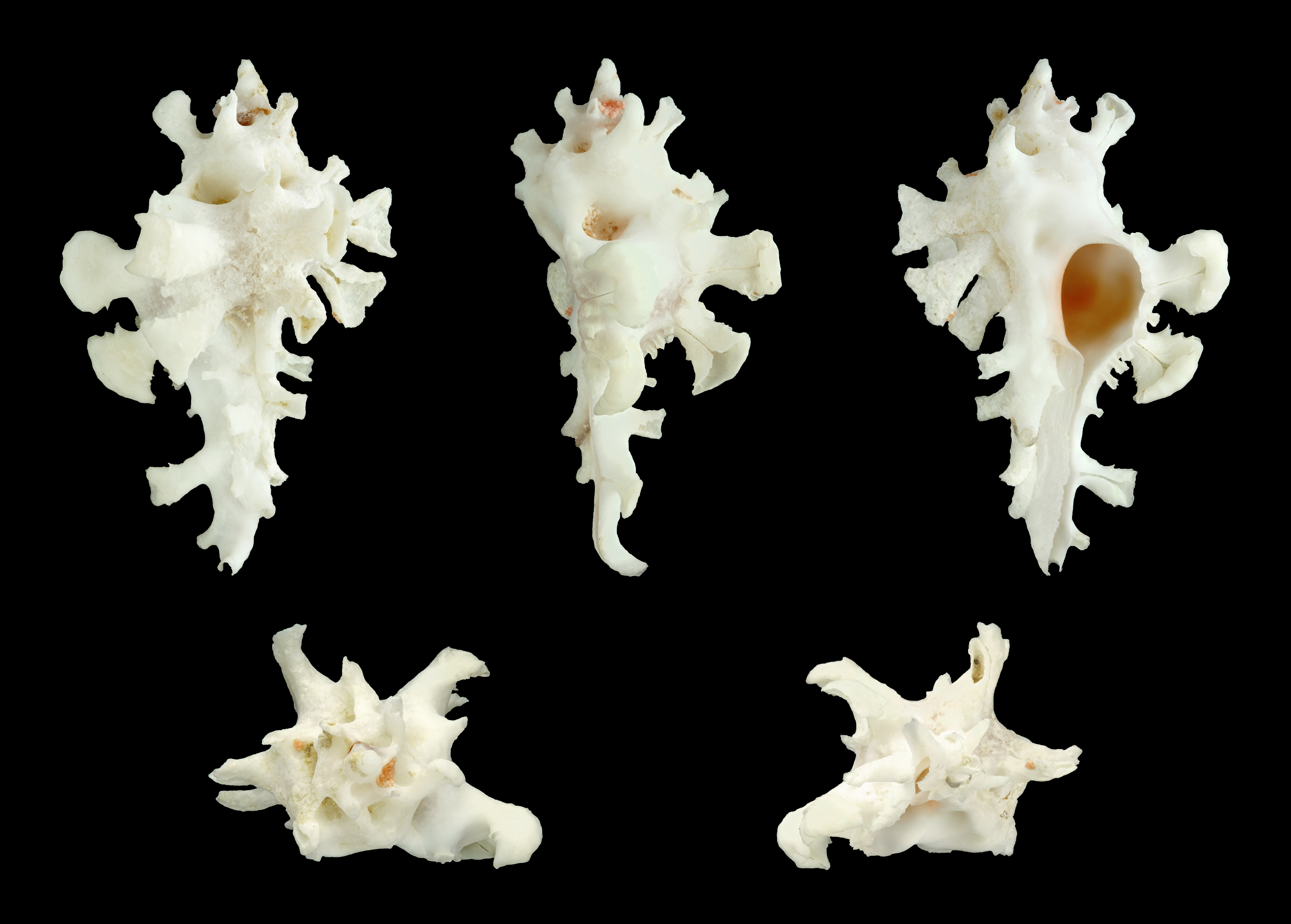

Scientific classification
- Kingdom: Animalia
- Phylum: Mollusca
- Class: Gastropoda
- Subclass: Caenogastropoda
- Order: Neogastropoda
- Family: Muricidae
- Genus: Homalocantha
- Species: H. zamboi

Binomial name
- Homalocantha zamboi (Burch & Burch, 1960)

Synonyms
- Homalocantha anatomica var. zamboi Burch & Burch, 1960

= Homalocantha zamboi =

Species of gastropod

Homalocantha zamboi is a species of sea snail, a marine gastropod mollusk in the family Muricidae, the murex snails or rock snails.

== Description ==
Shell size is 35 mm.

== Distribution ==
Mascarene Basin, Zamboanga (province), Philippines.

Found in Red Sea near Phillipians.
