= Maxwellia (gastropod) =

Scientific classification
- Kingdom: Animalia
- Phylum: Mollusca
- Class: Gastropoda
- Subclass: Caenogastropoda
- Order: Neogastropoda
- Family: Muricidae
- Subfamily: Muricopsinae
- Genus: Maxwellia; Baily, 1950

Type species
- Murex gemma Sowerby, 1879

Genus of gastropods

Maxwellia is a genus of sea snails, marine gastropod mollusks in the family Muricidae, the murex snails or rock snails.

The genus was named after Maxwell Smith (1888–1961), an American malacologist.

== Description ==
The species in this genus have small to moderate-sized, solid fusiform shells with a low, globose spire. The siphonal canal is rather short, curved to the left, fused at the top and almost sealed below. They have six to seven well-developed varices per whorl, with deep hollows at the sutures. These varices extend from the shoulder margin to the tip of the siphonal canal and become twisted at the base of the shell. The deflection of the varices at the top of the shoulder of each whorl gives rise to a small pointed spine pointing to the preceding varix.

== Species ==
Species within the genus Maxwellia include:

- Maxwellia angermeyerae (Emerson & D'Attilio, 1965)
- Maxwellia gemma (Sowerby, 1879)
- Maxwellia santarosana (Dall, 1905)
