= Homalocantha elatensis =

Scientific classification
- Kingdom: Animalia
- Phylum: Mollusca
- Class: Gastropoda
- Subclass: Caenogastropoda
- Order: Neogastropoda
- Family: Muricidae
- Genus: Homalocantha
- Species: H. elatensis

Binomial name
- Homalocantha elatensis Heiman & Mienis, 2009

Synonyms
- Homalocantha anatomica elatensis Heiman & Mienis, 2009

Species of gastropod

Homalocantha elatensis is a species of sea snail, a marine gastropod mollusk in the family Muricidae, the murex snails or rock snails.
