= Genkaimurex varicosus =

Scientific classification
- Kingdom: Animalia
- Phylum: Mollusca
- Class: Gastropoda
- Subclass: Caenogastropoda
- Order: Neogastropoda
- Family: Muricidae
- Genus: Genkaimurex
- Species: G. varicosus

Binomial name
- Genkaimurex varicosus (Kuroda, 1953)

Synonyms
- Coralliophila (Genkaimurex) varicosa Kuroda, 1953

Species of gastropod

Genkaimurex varicosus is a species of sea snail, a marine gastropod mollusk in the family Muricidae, the murex snails or rock snails.
