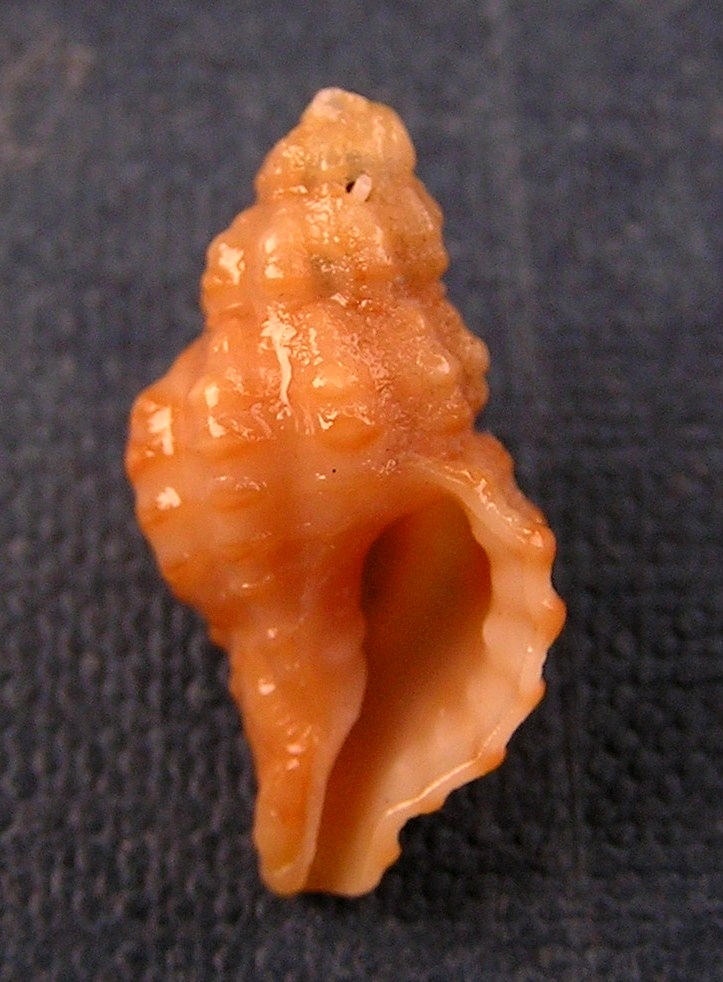
- An apertural view of a shell of Muricopsis (Muricopsis) necocheanus

Scientific classification
- Kingdom: Animalia
- Phylum: Mollusca
- Class: Gastropoda
- Subclass: Caenogastropoda
- Order: Neogastropoda
- Superfamily: Muricoidea
- Family: Muricidae
- Subfamily: Muricopsinae; Radwin & D'Attilio, 1971

Genera
- See text

= Muricopsinae =

Subfamily of gastropods

Muricopsinae is a taxonomic subfamily of predatory sea snails, marine gastropod mollusks within the large family Muricidae, the murex snails and rock snails.

A study, released in September 2010, showed that the subfamily Muricopsinae is polyphyletic

== Characteristics ==
This subfamily has been delineated based on the characteristics of the operculum and the radula.

The shell is wide in the middle and tapers at both ends, making it fusiform to biconic. The size of the shell varies in length between 5 mm and 85 mm. Its color is white or brown, covered with subdued shades of brown, orange, red or purple markings. The aperture is broadly oval to almost round and is of variable size. Contrary to the other Muricidae, the siphonal canal, the semi-tubular extension of the aperture, is of moderate length. Like the other murex shells, each convex whorl shows a variable number (four or more) of more or less prominent varices (a thickened axial ridge in the shell), which, in turn, show foliaceous or spinose projections.

The operculum is the same as in the subfamily Muricinae. It is unguiculate, thickened at the margin and depressed and annulate in the middle.

The rachiglossan radula has in each row a three-dimensional rachidian tooth with a raised central cusp and two lateral teeth, as in the subfamily Ocenebrinae.

== Distribution ==
The genera in this subfamily are distributed worldwide, mainly in tropical and subtropical waters, at depths between 0 and 300 m.

== Genera ==
- Acanthotrophon Hertlein & Strong, 1951
- Bizetiella Radwin & D'Attilio, 1972
- Eofavartia Merle, 2002
- Favartia Jousseaume, 1880
- Homalocantha Mörch, 1852
- Maxwellia Baily, 1950
- Murexsul Iredale, 1915
- Muricopsis Bucquoy & Dautzenberg, 1882
- Pazinotus E.H. Vokes, 1970
- Pradoxa Fernandes & Rolan, 1993
- Pygmaepterys E. H. Vokes, 1978
- Rolandiella B.A. Marshall & Burch, 2000
- Subpterynotus Olsson & Harbison, 1953
- Vitularia Swainson, 1840
- Xastilia Bouchet & Houart, 1994

Several genera that were recognized in the past have now become synonyms :

- Minnimurex Woolacott, 1957 accepted as Murexiella Clench & Farfante, 1945
- Murexiella Clench & Farfante, 1945 accepted as Favartia (Murexiella) Clench & Perez Farfante, 1945
- Paradoxa Fernandes & Rolan, 1990 accepted as Pradoxa Fernandes & Rolan, 1993
- Paradoxon Fernandes & Rolán, 1990 accepted as Pradoxa Fernandes & Rolan, 1993
- Risomurex Olsson & McGinty, 1958 accepted as Muricopsis (Risomurex) Olsson & McGinty, 1958
- Transtrafer Iredale, 1929 accepted as Vitularia Swainson, 1840
