= List of gastropods described in 2019 =

This list of gastropods described in 2019 is a list of new taxa of snails and slugs of every kind that have been described (following the rules of the ICZN) during the year 2019. The list only includes taxa at the rank of genus or species.

== Marine gastropods ==
=== New species ===
==== Vetigastropoda ====
The following new vetigastropod species were described:

- Calliostoma apicisuperi S.-I Huang & I.-F. Fu, 2019
- Calliostoma hungi S.-I Huang & I.-F. Fu, 2019
- Calliostoma lui S.-I Huang & I.-F. Fu, 2019
- Calliostoma valkuri Cavallari, Salvador, Dornellas & Simone 2019
- Callogaza nubelevis S.-I Huang & I.-F. Fu, 2019
- Cordarene daike S.-I Huang, M.-H. Lin & C.-L. Chen, 2019
- Diodora terezae Neves, Castillo & Ramil, 2019

==== Neogastropoda ====
The following new neogastropod species were described:

- Abyssotrophon fusiformis Houart, Vermeij & Wiedrick, 2019
- Abyssotrophon newmani Houart, Vermeij & Wiedrick, 2019
- Acanthotrophon latispinosus Garrigues & Lamy, 2019
- Aesopus benitoensis deMaintenon, 2019
- Attiliosa laurecorbariae Garrigues & Lamy, 2019
- Attiliosa pygmaea Garrigues & Lamy, 2019
- Axifex retis S.-I Huang & M.-H. Lin, 2019
- Babelomurex meimiaoae S.-I Huang & Y.-F. Huang, 2019
- Boreotrophon aleuticus Houart, Vermeij & Wiedrick, 2019
- Boreotrophon cascadiensis Houart, Vermeij & Wiedrick, 2019
- Boreotrophon cordellensis Houart, Vermeij & Wiedrick, 2019
- Boreotrophon cortesianus Houart, Vermeij & Wiedrick, 2019
- Boreotrophon obesus Houart, Vermeij & Wiedrick, 2019
- Boreotrophon pseudotripherus Houart, Vermeij & Wiedrick, 2019
- Boreotrophon santarosensis Houart, Vermeij & Wiedrick, 2019
- Boreotrophon subapolyonis Houart, Vermeij & Wiedrick, 2019
- Boreotrophon tannerensis Houart, Vermeij & Wiedrick, 2019
- Boreotrophon vancouverensis Houart, Vermeij & Wiedrick, 2019
- Claremontiella adiakritos Houart, Zuccon & Puillandre, 2019
- Clathrodrillia vezzaronellyae Cossignani, 2019
- Colubraria acroincisa S.-I Huang & M.-H. Lin, 2019
- Colubraria ralliserra S.-I Huang & M.-H. Lin, 2019
- Conasprella (Fusiconus) philippequiquandoni (Cossignani, 2019)
- Conasprella philippequiquandoni (Cossignani, 2019)
- Conus (Kalloconus) josefiadeiroi (Cossignani & Fiadeiro, 2019)
- Conus (Pionoconus) mascarenensis (Monnier & Limpalaër, 2019)
- Conus brianoi (Cossignani & Allary, 2019)
- Conus desiradensis Rabiller & Richard, 2019
- Conus josefiadeiroi (Cossignani & Fiadeiro, 2019)
- Conus lamyi Rabiller & Richard, 2019
- Conus laurenti Rabiller & Richard, 2019
- Conus mascarenensis (Monnier & Limpalaër, 2019)
- Conus nicopuillandrei Rabiller & Richard, 2019
- Conus oualeiriensis Rabiller & Richard, 2019
- Conus piti Rabiller & Richard, 2019
- Cyclimetula altior S.-I Huang & M.-H. Lin, 2019
- Cyclimetula hsui S.-I Huang & M.-H. Lin, 2019
- Cytharomorula absidata Houart, Zuccon & Puillandre, 2019
- Cytharomorula arta Houart, Zuccon & Puillandre, 2019
- Cytharomorula fatuhivaensis Houart, Zuccon & Puillandre, 2019
- Cytharomorula manusuduirauti Houart, Zuccon & Puillandre, 2019
- Dermomurex gutta Garrigues & Lamy, 2019
- Dermomurex lanceolatus Garrigues & Lamy, 2019
- Duplicaria kirstenae Terryn & Fraussen, 2019
- Favartia concava Garrigues & Lamy, 2019
- Favartia minuta Garrigues & Lamy, 2019
- Fusiconus (Fusiconus) philippequiquandoni Cossignani, 2019
- Fusinus maritzaallaryae Cossignani & Allary, 2019
- Fusinus maritzaallaryi Cossignani & Allary, 2019
- Hastula kiiensis Chino & Terryn, 2019
- Hastula ogasawarana Chino & Terryn, 2019
- Hyalina valentinae Cossignani, 2019
- Kalloconus (Trovaoconus) josefiadeiroi Cossignani & Fiadeiro, 2019
- Kalloconus josefiadeiroi Cossignani & Fiadeiro, 2019
- Lamellilatirus boucheti Lyons & Snyder, 2019
- Lamellilatirus corrugatus Lyons & Snyder, 2019
- Marginella amirantensis Boyer & Rosado, 2019
- Marginella benthedii Boyer & Rosado, 2019
- Marginella catenata Boyer & Rosado, 2019
- Marginella coronata Boyer & Rosado, 2019
- Marginella procera Boyer & Rosado, 2019
- Marginella rutila Boyer & Rosado, 2019
- Marginella signata Boyer & Rosado, 2019
- Marginella squamosa Boyer & Rosado, 2019
- Marginella storea Boyer & Rosado, 2019
- Metula agaoensis S.-I Huang & M.-H. Lin, 2019
- Metula eureka S.-I Huang & M.-H. Lin, 2019
- Metula mozambicana S.-I Huang & M.-H. Lin, 2019
- Mitrella albomaculata Bozzetti, 2019
- Mitrella bellula Bozzetti, 2019
- Mitrella exilis Bozzetti, 2019
- Mitrella incisa Bozzetti, 2019
- Muricopsis barbarae Garrigues & Lamy, 2019
- Muricopsis corallinus Garrigues & Lamy, 2019
- Muricopsis leblondae Garrigues & Lamy, 2019
- Muricopsis linealbus Garrigues & Lamy, 2019
- Nassarius maxuitongi S.-Q. Zhang, S.-P. Zhang & H.-T. Li, 2019
- Nipponotrophon exquisitus Houart, Vermeij & Wiedrick, 2019
- Oliva brunellae Cossignani, 2019
- Orania pseudopacifica Houart, Zuccon & Puillandre, 2019
- Paciocinebrina macleani Houart, Vermeij & Wiedrick, 2019
- Paciocinebrina pseudomunda Houart, Vermeij & Wiedrick, 2019
- Paciocinebrina thelmacrowae Houart, Vermeij & Wiedrick, 2019
- Parametaria barbieri K. Monsecour & D. Monsecour, 2019
- Pionoconus mascarenensis Monnier & Limpalaër, 2019
- Pleurifera hawaiiensis K. Monsecour & D. Monsecour, 2019
- Pygmaepterys maestratii Garrigues & Lamy, 2019
- Scabricola marieae Cossignani, 2019
- Scabrotrophon buldirensis Houart, Vermeij & Wiedrick, 2019
- Scabrotrophon kantori Houart, Vermeij & Wiedrick, 2019
- Scabrotrophon lima Houart, Vermeij & Wiedrick, 2019
- Scabrotrophon macleani Houart, Vermeij & Wiedrick, 2019
- Scabrotrophon moresbyensis Houart, Vermeij & Wiedrick, 2019
- Scabrotrophon norafosterae Houart, Vermeij & Wiedrick, 2019
- Scabrotrophon trifidus Houart, Vermeij & Wiedrick, 2019
- Scaphella junonia curryi Petuch & Berschauer, 2019
- Tenguella chinoi Houart, Zuccon & Puillandre, 2019
- Tenguella ericius Houart, Zuccon & Puillandre, 2019
- Tenorioconus brianoi Cossignani & Allary, 2019
- Vexillum (Pusia) jeanetteae R. Salisbury, 2019
- Vexillum (Pusia) johnsoni R. Salisbury, 2019
- Vexillum jeanetteae R. Salisbury, 2019
- Vexillum johnsoni R. Salisbury, 2019
- Zanassarina guadalupensis deMaintenon, 2019
- Zanassarina insularis deMaintenon, 2019

==== Nudibranchia ====
The following new nudibranch species were described:

- Janolus flavoanulatus Pola & Gosliner, 2019
- Janolus incrustans Pola & Gosliner, 2019
- Janolus tricellariodes Pola & Gosliner, 2019
- Madrella amphora Pola & Gosliner, 2019
- Okenia longiductis Pola, Paz-Sedano, Macali, Minchin, Marchini, Vitale, Licchelli & Crocetta, 2019
- Okenia problematica Pola, Paz-Sedano, Macali, Minchin, Marchini, Vitale, Licchelli & Crocetta, 2019
- Unidentia aliciae Korshunova, Mehrotra, Arnold, Lundin, Picton & Martynov, 2019

=== New genera ===
- Cyclimetula S.-I Huang & M.-H. Lin, 2019
- Warenia Houart, Vermeij & Wiedrick, 2019

== Freshwater gastropods ==
- Bosnidilhia vitojaensis Grego, Glöer, Falniowski, Hofman & Osikowski, 2019
- Bythinella magdalenae Glöer & Hirschfelder, 2019
- Bythinella sitiensis Glöer & Hirschfelder, 2019
- Bythinella steffeki Grego & Glöer, 2019
- Fluminicola klamathensis Liu & Hershler, 2019
- Paladilhiopsis cattaroensis Grego, Glöer, Falniowski, Hofman & Osikowski, 2019
- Paladilhiopsis matejkoi Grego, Glöer, Falniowski, Hofman & Osikowski, 2019
- Plagigeyeria feheri Grego, Glöer, Falniowski, Hofman & Osikowski, 2019
- Pseudamnicola occulta Glöer & Hirschfelder, 2019
- Radix dgebuadzei Aksenova, Vinarski, Kondakov, Tomilova, Artamonova, Makhrov, Kononov, Gofarov, Fang & Bolotov, 2019
- Salaeniella valdaligaensis Boeters, Quiñonero-Salgado & Ruiz-Cobo, 2019
- Stygobium hercegnoviensis Grego, Glöer, Falniowski, Hofman & Osikowski, 2019
- Travunijana vruljakensis Grego & Glöer, 2019
- Valvata armeniaca Glöer & Walther, 2019
- Valvata kournasi Glöer & Hirschfelder, 2019

== Land gastropods ==
=== New species ===
- Afrocyclus bhaca Cole, 2019
- Afrocyclus oxygala Cole, 2019
- Afrocyclus potteri Cole, 2019
- Aulacospira krobyloides Páll-Gergely & Schilthuizen, 2019
- Aulacospira lens Páll-Gergely & Auffenberg, 2019
- Bradybaena linjun Wu & Chen, 2019
- Chondrocyclus amathole Cole, 2019
- Chondrocyclus cooperae Cole, 2019
- Chondrocyclus devilliersi Cole, 2019
- Chondrocyclus herberti Cole, 2019
- Chondrocyclus kevincolei Cole, 2019
- Chondrocyclus langebergensis Cole, 2019
- Chondrocyclus pondoensis Cole, 2019
- Chondrocyclus pulcherrimus Cole, 2019
- Chondrocyclus silvicolus Cole, 2019
- Cyclophorus cucphuongensis Oheimb, 2019
- Cyclophorus paracucphuongensis Oheimb, 2019
- Cyclophorus phongnhakebangensis Oheimb, 2019
- Cyclophorus takumisaitoi Hirano, 2019
- Cyclophorus tamdaoensis Do & Do, 2019
- Cylindrophaedusa parvula Gittenberger & Leda, 2019
- Cylindrophaedusa tenzini Gittenberger & Sherub, 2019
- Drymaeus verecundus Breure & Mogollón, 2019
- Ennea nigeriensis de Winter & de Gier, 2019
- Eostrobilops zijinshanicus Chen, 2019
- Formosana renzhigangi Grego & Szekeres, 2019
- Ganesella halabalah Sutcharit & Panha, 2019
- Georissa corrugata Khalik, Hendriks, Vermeulen & Schilthuizen, 2019
- Georissa insulae Khalik, Hendriks, Vermeulen & Schilthuizen, 2019
- Georissa trusmadi Khalik, Hendriks, Vermeulen & Schilthuizen, 2019
- Haploptychius bachmaensis Bui, Do, Ngo & Do, 2019
- Hemiplecta jensi Páll-Gergely, 2019
- Laocaia simovi Dedov & Schneppat, 2019
- Muangnua arborea Tumpeesuwan & Tumpeesuwan, 2019
- Notharinia constricta Vermeulen, Luu, Theary & Anker, 2019
- Notharinia lyostoma Vermeulen, Luu, Theary & Anker, 2019
- Notharinia ongensis Vermeulen, Luu, Theary & Anker, 2019
- Notharinia soluta Vermeulen, Luu, Theary & Anker, 2019
- Notharinia stenobasis Vermeulen, Luu, Theary & Anker, 2019
- Notharinia subduplex Vermeulen, Luu, Theary & Anker, 2019
- Notharinia whitteni Vermeulen, Luu, Theary & Anker, 2019
- Oospira haivanensis Bui & Szekeres, 2019
- Perrottetia namdongensis Bui, Do, Ngo & Do, 2019
- Phaedusa adrianae Gittenberger & Leda, 2019
- Phaedusa chimiae Gittenberger & Sherub, 2019
- Phaedusa sangayae Gittenberger & Leda, 2019
- Pseudopomatias barnai Gittenberger, Leda, Sherub & Gyeltshen, 2019
- Pseudostreptaxis harli Páll-Gergely & Schilthuizen, 2019
- Serriphaedusa (Gibbophaedusa) gerberi Grego & Szekeres, 2019
- Sinochloritis lii Wu & Chen, 2019
- Sinoxychilus melanoleucus Wu & Liu, 2019
- Zospeum gittenbergeri Jochum, Prieto & De Winter, 2019
- Zospeum praetermissum Jochum, Prieto & De Winter, 2019

=== New subspecies ===
- Albinaria latelamellaris kekovensis Örsten, 2019
- Alopia livida vargabandii Fehér et Szekeres, 2019
- Cyclophorus implicatus kanhoensis Do & Do, 2019

== See also ==
- List of gastropods described in 2018
- List of gastropods described in 2020
