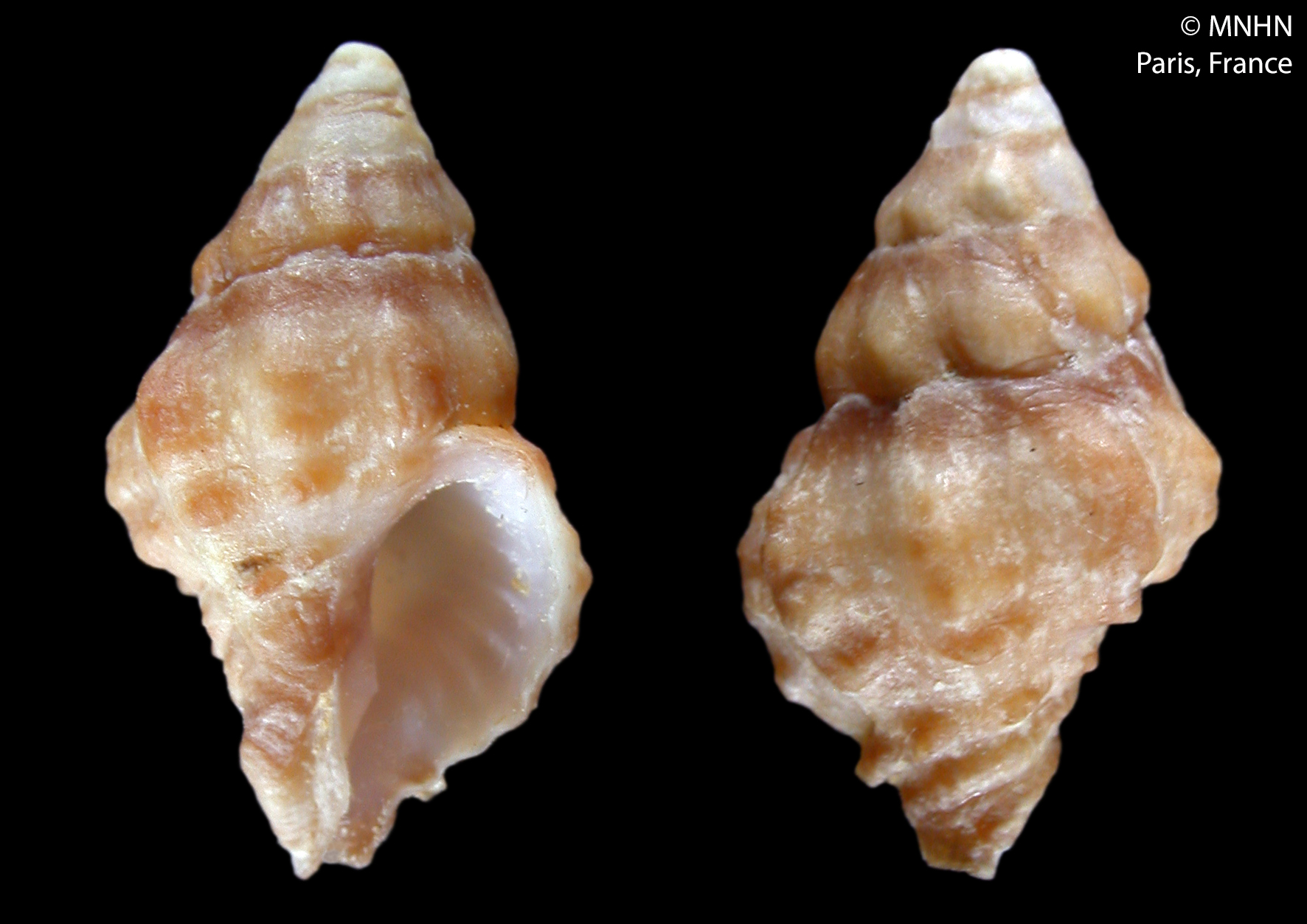
- Shell of Attiliosa laurecorbariae (specimen at MNHN, Paris)

Scientific classification
- Kingdom: Animalia
- Phylum: Mollusca
- Class: Gastropoda
- Subclass: Caenogastropoda
- Order: Neogastropoda
- Superfamily: Muricoidea
- Family: Muricidae
- Subfamily: Aspellinae
- Genus: Attiliosa; Emerson, 1968

Type species
- Coralliophila incompta Berry, 1960

Species
- See text

= Attiliosa =

Genus of gastropods

Attiliosa is a genus of sea snails, marine gastropod mollusks in the subfamily Aspellinae of the family Muricidae, the murex snails or rock snails.

== Characteristics ==
The genus currently contains about 33 recognized species, with several fossil species dating back to the Eocene. The genus was established by William K. Emerson in 1968. In older malacological literature, many Attiliosa species were originally described under the genera Murex, Muricidea or Vasum

The genus is often characterized by sturdy, fusiform shells with prominent axial ribs and spines.

The shape of the shell is generally ovate-fusiform to short-fusiform, with an acute, pyramidal spire. Most species are relatively small, ranging from 15 mm to 30 mm in length. The sculpture consists of 7 to 9 varices (ribs) per whorl. These varices often bear short, sharp, or tubular spines. The aperture is usually oval and often reinforced with lirae (internal ridges) on the outer lip. Many species are white, waxy or light tan, sometimes decorated with brown spiral lines or spots

== Species ==
Species within the genus Attiliosa include:

- Attiliosa aldridgei (Nowell-Usticke, 1969)
- † Attiliosa arenaria Darragh, 2017
- Attiliosa bessei Vokes, 1999
- Attiliosa bozzettii Houart, 1993
- Attiliosa caledonica (Jousseaume, 1881)
- Attiliosa edingeri Houart, 1998
- † Attiliosa emilyae Lozouet, 2023
- Attiliosa eosae Espinosa & Ortea, 2016
- † Attiliosa evae (Kovács & Vicián, 2024)
- † Attiliosa gallica Landau, Merle, Ceulemans & Van Dingenen, 2019
- † Attiliosa gibsonsmithi E. H. Vokes, 1999
- Attiliosa glenduffyi Petuch, 1993
- Attiliosa goreensis Houart, 1993
- † Attiliosa gretae E. H. Vokes, 1999
- Attiliosa houarti Vokes, 1999
- † Attiliosa juhaszi Kovács & Vicián, 2024
- Attiliosa kevani Vokes, 1999
- Attiliosa laurecorbariae Garrigues & Lamy, 2019
- † Attiliosa macgintyi E. H. Vokes, 1999
- † Attiliosa nassatella (Grateloup, 1845)
- Attiliosa nodulifera (G.B. Sowerby II, 1841)
- Attiliosa nodulosa (A. Adams, 1854)
- Attiliosa orri (Cernohorsky, 1976)
- Attiliosa perplexa Vokes, 1999
- Attiliosa philippiana (Dall, 1889)
- Attiliosa poeyi (Sarasúa & Espinosa, 1979)
- † Attiliosa pouweri Landau, Merle, Ceulemans & Van Dingenen, 2019
- Attiliosa pygmaea Garrigues & Lamy, 2019
- † Attiliosa recognita (Bałuk, 2006)
- Attiliosa ruthae Houart, 1996
- † Attiliosa septaspinosa Lozouet, 2023
- † Attiliosa subgretae Lozouet, 2023
- † Attiliosa villai (Michelotti, 1847)

== Synonyms ==
- Attiliosa incompta (S. S. Berry, 1960): synonym of Attiliosa nodulosa (A. Adams, 1855)
- Attiliosa sperata (Cossmann, 1921): synonym of Gracilipurpura sperata (Cossmann, 1921)
- Attiliosa striatoides (E. H. Vokes, 1980): synonym of Acanthotrophon striatoides E. H. Vokes, 1980
- Attiliosa sunderlandi (Petuch, 1987): synonym of Murexsul sunderlandi (Petuch, 1987)
- † Attiliosa villae (Michelotti, 1847): synonym of † Attiliosa villai (Michelotti, 1847) (incorrect grammatical agreement of specific epithet)
