= Acanthotrophon sorenseni =

Scientific classification
- Kingdom: Animalia
- Phylum: Mollusca
- Class: Gastropoda
- Subclass: Caenogastropoda
- Order: Neogastropoda
- Family: Muricidae
- Genus: Acanthotrophon
- Species: A. sorenseni

Binomial name
- Acanthotrophon sorenseni (Hertlein & Strong, 1951)

Synonyms
- Austrotrophon panamensis Olsson, 1971; Trophon (Acanthotrophon) sorenseni Hertlein & Strong, 1951

Species of gastropod

Acanthotrophon sorenseni is a species of sea snail, a marine gastropod mollusk in the family Muricidae, the murex snails or rock snails.
