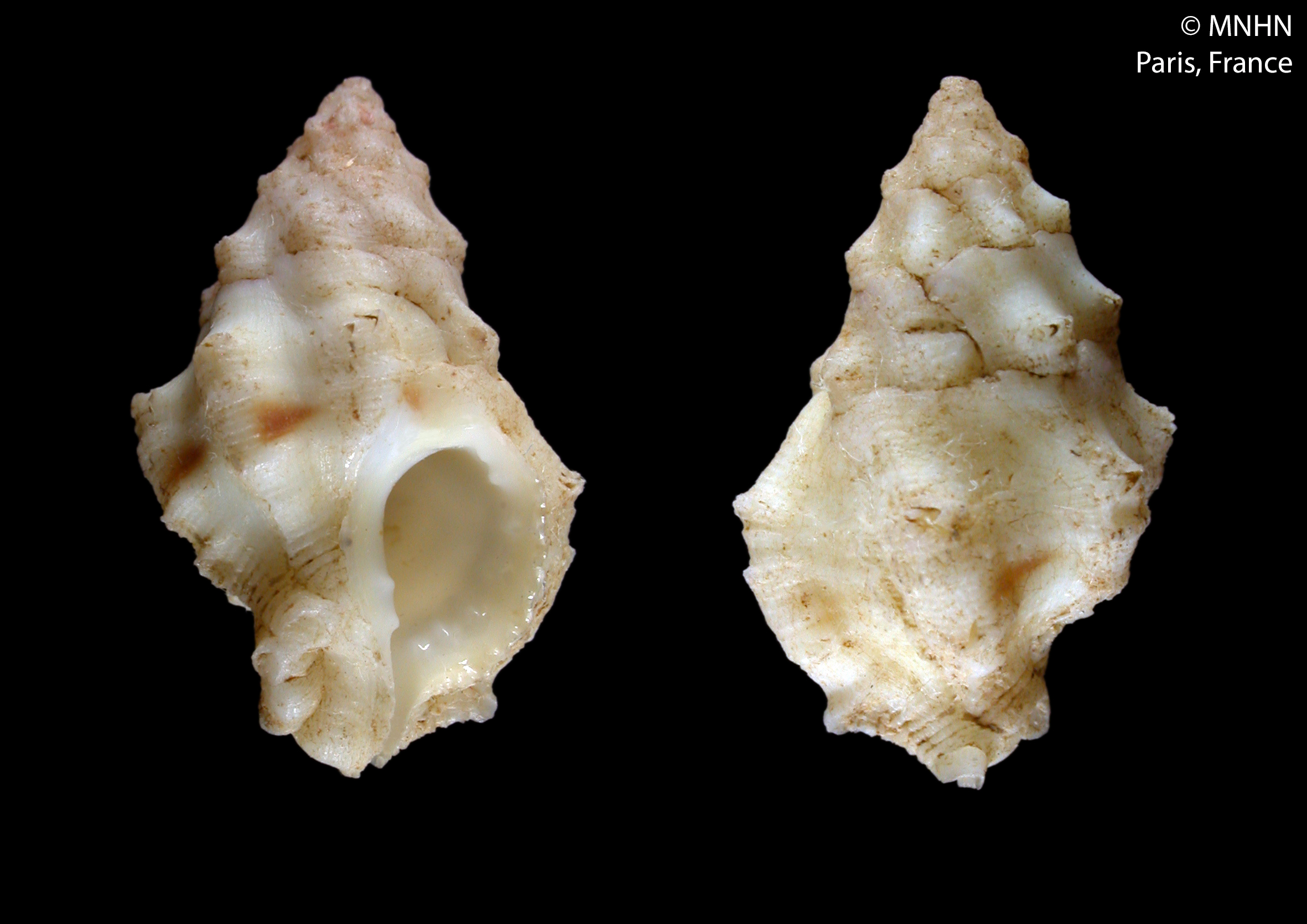
- Shell of Attiliosa poeyi (specimen at MNHN, Paris)

Scientific classification
- Kingdom: Animalia
- Phylum: Mollusca
- Class: Gastropoda
- Subclass: Caenogastropoda
- Order: Neogastropoda
- Family: Muricidae
- Genus: Attiliosa
- Species: A. poeyi

Binomial name
- Attiliosa poeyi (Sarasúa & Espinosa, 1979)

Synonyms
- Muricopsis poeyi Sarasúa & Espinosa, 1979 (original combination)

= Attiliosa poeyi =

Species of gastropod

Attiliosa poeyi is a species of sea snail, a marine gastropod mollusc in the family Muricidae, the murex snails or rock snails.

== Distribution ==
This marine species occurs off Cuba and Martinique.
