= Attiliosa eosae =

Scientific classification
- Kingdom: Animalia
- Phylum: Mollusca
- Class: Gastropoda
- Subclass: Caenogastropoda
- Order: Neogastropoda
- Family: Muricidae
- Genus: Attiliosa
- Species: A. eosae

Binomial name
- Attiliosa eosae Espinosa & Ortea, 2016

Species of gastropod

Attiliosa eosae is a species of sea snail, a marine gastropod mollusc in the family Muricidae, the murex snails or rock snails.

== Distribution ==
This marine gastropod occurs off Cuba.
