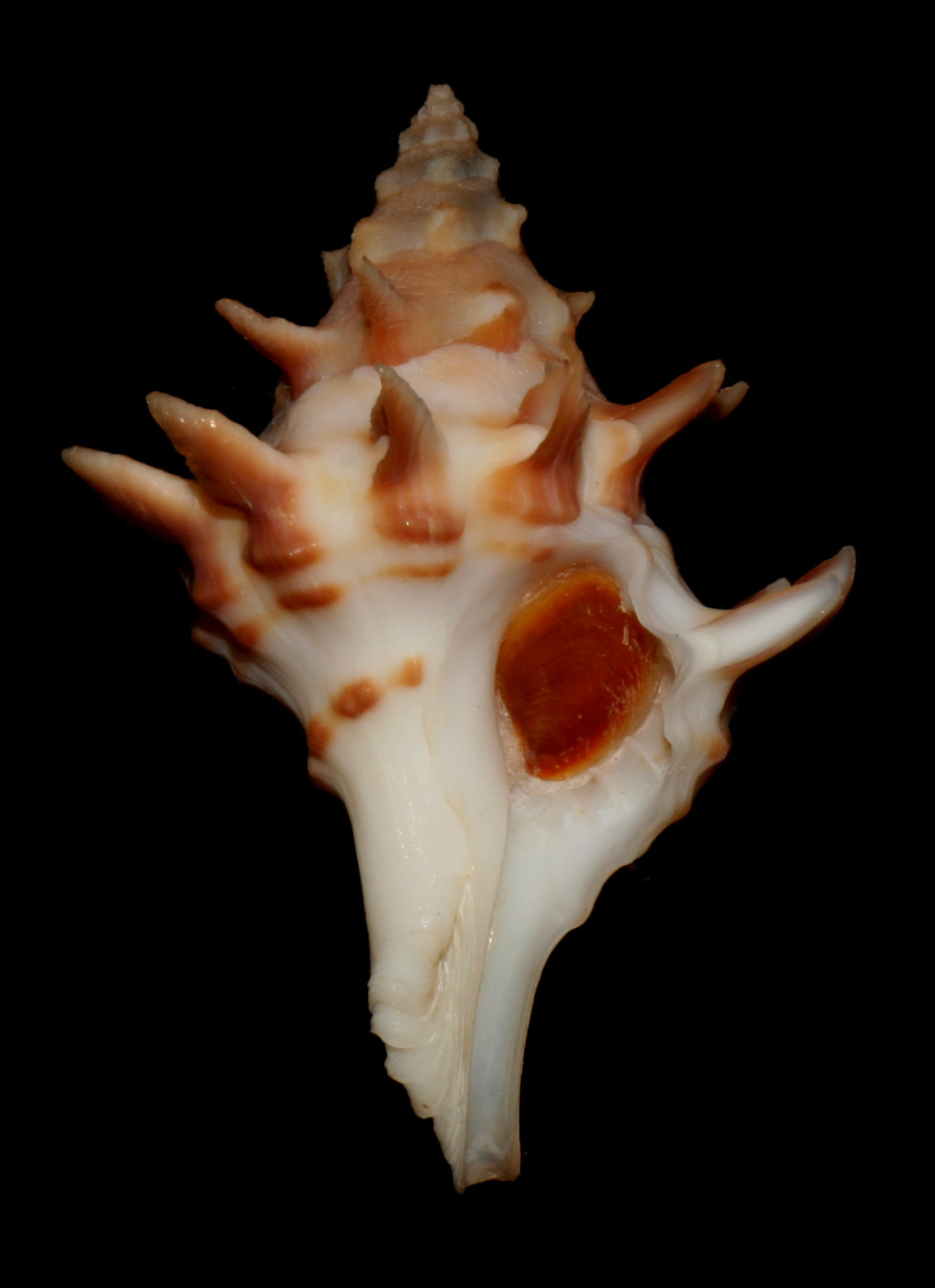
- A shell of Acanthotrophon sentus Berry, 1869
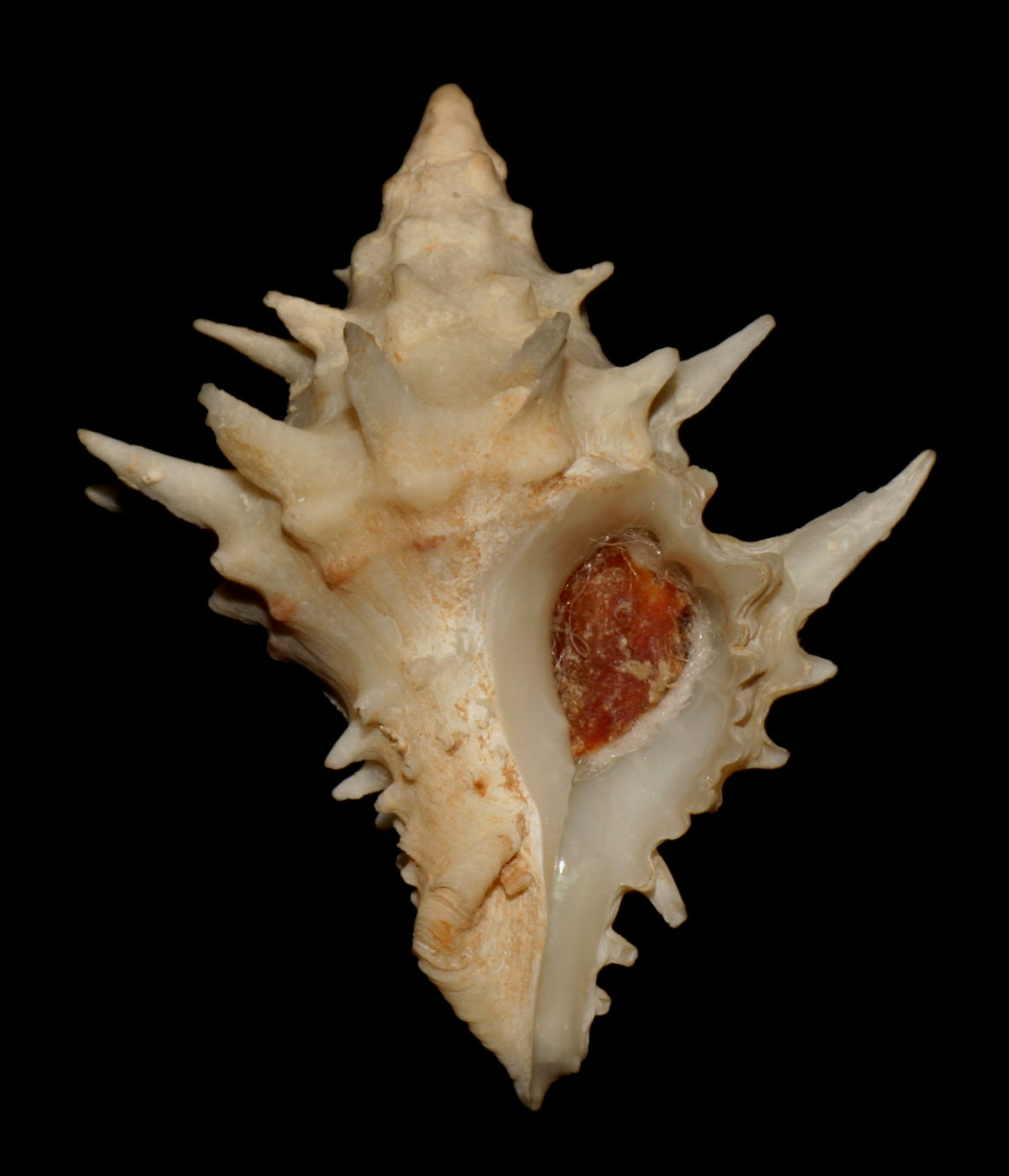
- A shell of Acanthotrophon carduus (Broderip, 1833)

Scientific classification
- Kingdom: Animalia
- Phylum: Mollusca
- Class: Gastropoda
- Subclass: Caenogastropoda
- Order: Neogastropoda
- Superfamily: Muricoidea
- Family: Muricidae
- Subfamily: Muricopsinae
- Genus: Acanthotrophon; Hertlein & Strong, 1951

Synonyms
- Trophon (Acanthotrophon) Hertlein & A. M. Strong, 1951 (original rank)

= Acanthotrophon =

Genus of gastropods

Acanthotrophon is a genus of sea snails, marine gastropod mollusks in the family Muricidae, the murex snails or rock snails.

== Species ==
Species within the genus Acanthotrophon include:

- † Acanthotrophon aquensis Lozouet, 1999
- † Acanthotrophon ascensus (E. H. Vokes, 1976) †
- † Acanthotrophon aturi (Deshayes, 1865)
- Acanthotrophon carduus (Broderip, 1833)
- Acanthotrophon latispinosus Garrigues & Lamy, 2019
- Acanthotrophon sentus Berry, 1969
- Acanthotrophon sorenseni (Hertlein & Strong, 1951)
- Acanthotrophon striatoides Vokes, 1980
- † Acanthotrophon striatus (Gabb, 1873)
