= Attiliosa glenduffyi =

Scientific classification
- Kingdom: Animalia
- Phylum: Mollusca
- Class: Gastropoda
- Subclass: Caenogastropoda
- Order: Neogastropoda
- Family: Muricidae
- Genus: Attiliosa
- Species: A. glenduffyi

Binomial name
- Attiliosa glenduffyi Petuch, 1993

Species of gastropod

Attiliosa glenduffyi is a species of sea snail and a marine gastropod mollusc in the family Muricidae. It is also known as the murex snail or rock snail.

== Description ==
The length of the holotype attains 13 mm, its diameter is 9 mm.

== Distribution ==
This marine species occurs in the Caribbean Sea off Guadeloupe, the Dominican Republic, and Martinique.
