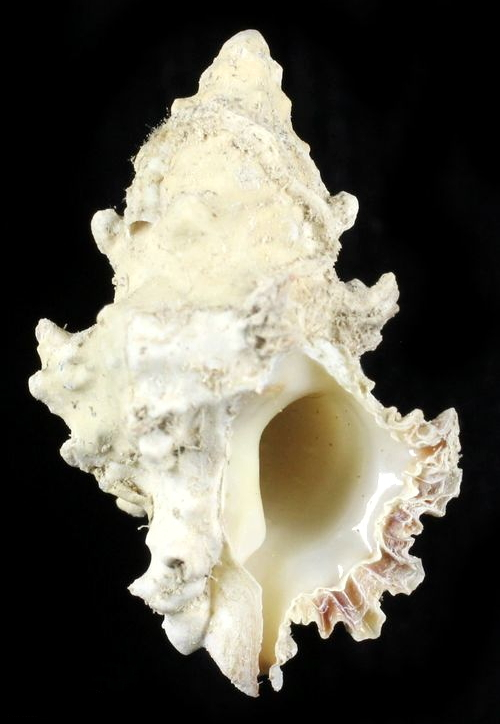
- Shell of Attiliosa nodulifera (specimen at MNHN, Paris)

Scientific classification
- Kingdom: Animalia
- Phylum: Mollusca
- Class: Gastropoda
- Subclass: Caenogastropoda
- Order: Neogastropoda
- Family: Muricidae
- Genus: Attiliosa
- Species: A. nodulifera

Binomial name
- Attiliosa nodulifera (G.B. Sowerb II, 1841)

Synonyms
- Latiaxis exfoliatus G. B. Sowerby II, 1882 (unnecessary substitute name for Murex pagodus A. Adams, 1853, by Sowerby said to be "preoccupied"); Murex (Muricidea) pagodus A. Adams, 1853; Murex (Trophon) fruticosus A. A. Gould, 1849 (junior subjective synonym); Murex exfoliatus Sowerby, 1882; Murex fruticosus Gould, 1849; Murex nodulifera Sowerby, 1841; Murex pagodus A. Adams, 1853; Muricopsis noduliferus (G. B. Sowerby II, 1841) ·

= Attiliosa nodulifera =

Species of gastropod

Attiliosa nodulifera, common names the noduled spiny drupa, the noduliferous murex, is a species of sea snail, a marine gastropod mollusc in the family Muricidae, the murex snails or rock snails.

== Description ==
The length of the holotype attains 20.2 mm, its diameter 12.8 mm.

(Original description in Latin as Murex pagodus) The shell is ovate-fusiform in shape. The spire is acuminated (tapering to a point), smooth, and white, painted anteriorly with scattered brown spots. There are seven concave whorls, which are adorned with rows of spines. These spines are regular, tubular, and recurved, featuring fimbriated (fringed or ruffled) margins. The aperture is sub-rounded, and the columella is smooth. The siphonal canal is recurved, inclined to the right, and is equal in length to the aperture.

== Distribution ==
This marine species occurs in the Indo-west Pacific; Fiji, Papua New Guinea; Philippines and Australia (Queensland).
