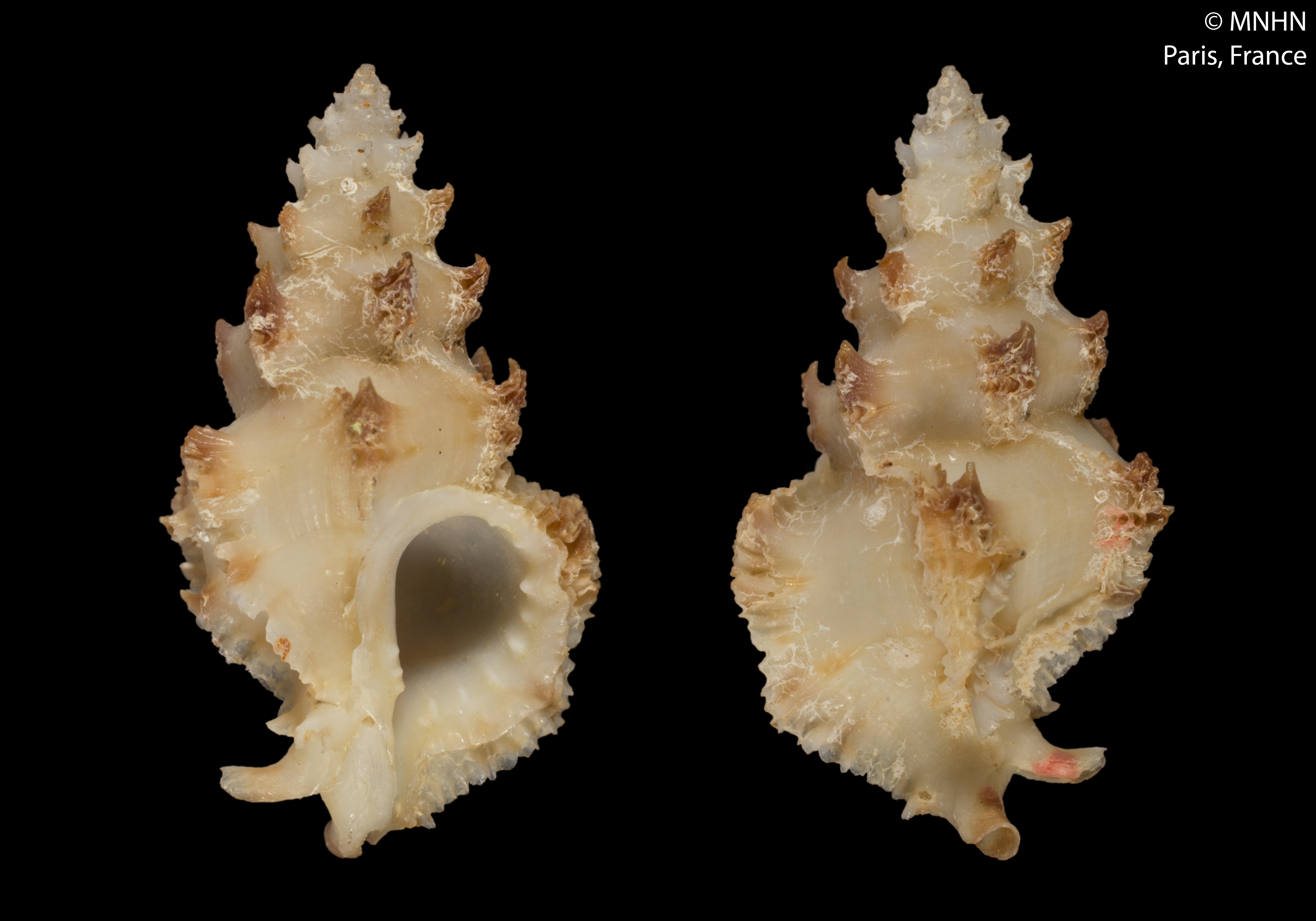
- Attiliosa ruthae (holotype the MNHN, Paris)

Scientific classification
- Kingdom: Animalia
- Phylum: Mollusca
- Class: Gastropoda
- Subclass: Caenogastropoda
- Order: Neogastropoda
- Family: Muricidae
- Genus: Attiliosa
- Species: A. ruthae

Binomial name
- Attiliosa ruthae Houart, 1996

= Attiliosa ruthae =

Species of gastropod

Attiliosa ruthae is a species of sea snail, a marine gastropod mollusk in the family Muricidae, the murex snails or rock snails.

== Description ==
The length of the holotype attains 31.9 mm, its diameter 18.1 mm.

== Distribution ==
This marine species occurs off the Philippines.
