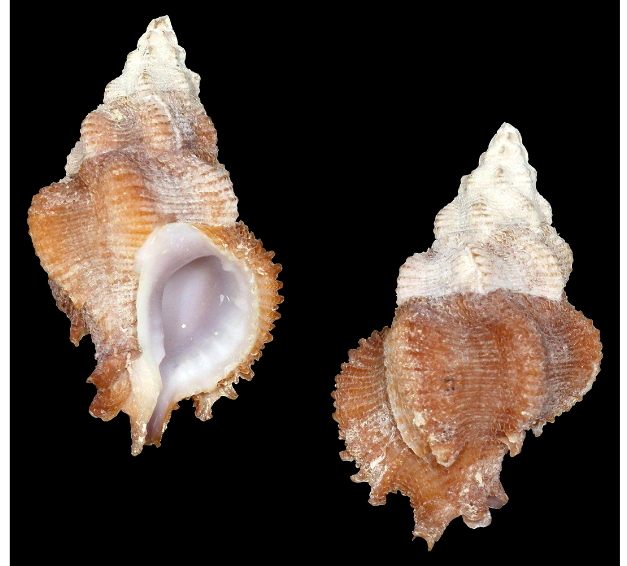
- Shell of Attiliosa houarti (specimen at the National Museum of Natural History, Smithsonian Institution)

Scientific classification
- Kingdom: Animalia
- Phylum: Mollusca
- Class: Gastropoda
- Subclass: Caenogastropoda
- Order: Neogastropoda
- Family: Muricidae
- Genus: Attiliosa
- Species: A. houarti

Binomial name
- Attiliosa houarti Vokes, 1999

= Attiliosa houarti =

Species of gastropod

Attiliosa houarti is a species of sea snail, a marine gastropod mollusc in the family Muricidae, the murex snails or rock snails.

== Description ==
The length of the holotype attains 23.5 mm, its diameter 12.9 mm.

== Distribution ==
This marine species occurs off Thailand.
