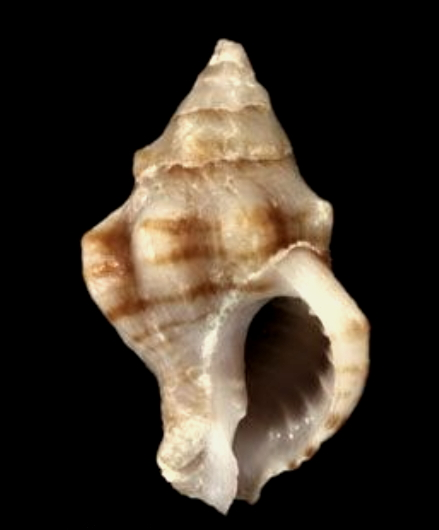
- Shell of Attiliosa bessei (specimen at the Natural History Museum Rotterdam)

Scientific classification
- Kingdom: Animalia
- Phylum: Mollusca
- Class: Gastropoda
- Subclass: Caenogastropoda
- Order: Neogastropoda
- Family: Muricidae
- Genus: Attiliosa
- Species: A. bessei

Binomial name
- Attiliosa bessei Vokes, 1999

= Attiliosa bessei =

Species of gastropod

Attiliosa bessei is a species of sea snail, a marine gastropod mollusc in the family Muricidae, the murex snails or rock snails.

== Description ==
The length of the holotype attains 24.6 mm, its diameter 14.5 mm.
