= Attiliosa perplexa =

Scientific classification
- Kingdom: Animalia
- Phylum: Mollusca
- Class: Gastropoda
- Subclass: Caenogastropoda
- Order: Neogastropoda
- Family: Muricidae
- Genus: Attiliosa
- Species: A. perplexa

Binomial name
- Attiliosa perplexa Vokes, 1999

Species of gastropod

Attiliosa perplexa is a species of sea snail, a marine gastropod mollusc in the family Muricidae, the murex snails or rock snails.

== Description ==
The length of the holotype attains 12.6 mm, its diameter 6.8 mm. Its shell is formed in an oblong spiral similar to a conch, with minor ridges and spines.

== Distribution ==
This marine species has been found on the coast of Brazil.
