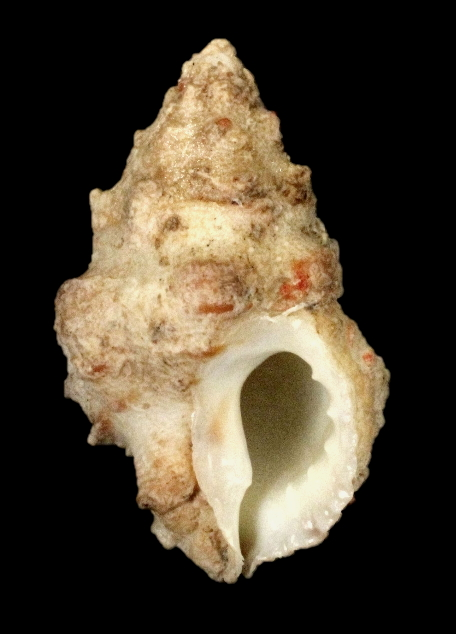
- Shell of Attiliosa philippiana (specimen at Naturalis Biodiversity Center)

Scientific classification
- Kingdom: Animalia
- Phylum: Mollusca
- Class: Gastropoda
- Subclass: Caenogastropoda
- Order: Neogastropoda
- Family: Muricidae
- Genus: Attiliosa
- Species: A. philippiana

Binomial name
- Attiliosa philippiana (Dall, 1889)

Synonyms
- Muricidea philippiana Dall, 1889

= Attiliosa philippiana =

Species of gastropod

Attiliosa philippiana is a species of sea snail, a marine gastropod mollusc in the family Muricidae, the murex snails or rock snails.

== Description ==
The length of the holotype attains 14.9 mm, its diameter 8.8 mm.

(Original description) The shell is short, acutely fusiform, and solid, consisting of approximately five whorls. The spire is acute, and the suture is flexuous and appressed. The slope of the spire remains nearly flat, as the turns are flattened or even slightly excavated above the periphery.

The transverse sculpture consists of lines of growth and a series of peripheral undulations or ribs—nine on the body whorl—separated by roughly equal interspaces. These ribs are almost entirely confined to the periphery. In one specimen, these are crossed by three or four nearly equidistant spiral ridges; these ridges are faint across the interspaces but become prominent and keeled or nodulous upon reaching the ribs. This particular specimen also features two strong ridges on the siphonal canal and is pure white in color.

In another specimen, only faint spiral striae are visible on the siphonal canal; the periphery is smooth and the ribs appear lumpy. This variation is white with spiral brown lines moving toward the periphery. In a third variation, the posterior row of nodulations becomes short, sharp, and spinous, while the revolving threads appear more numerous on the base.

The siphonal canal is short, rapidly tapering, open, and pointed. A well-marked siphonal fasciole is usually present, though one specimen hardly displays it, while another shows it in a funicular (cord-like) form. The aperture is an elongated oval, and the outer lip is reinforced with five to seven strong lirae within. The margin is simple and acute. The throat is porcelain-white, often showing a tendency toward rosy or purple tints. The columella is smooth, occasionally displaying a dash of rose or purple, and in perfectly adult specimens, two or three faint granulations appear near its anterior edge.

== Distribution ==
This marine species occurs off Florida, USA and off Mexico, Jamaica and the Bahamas.
