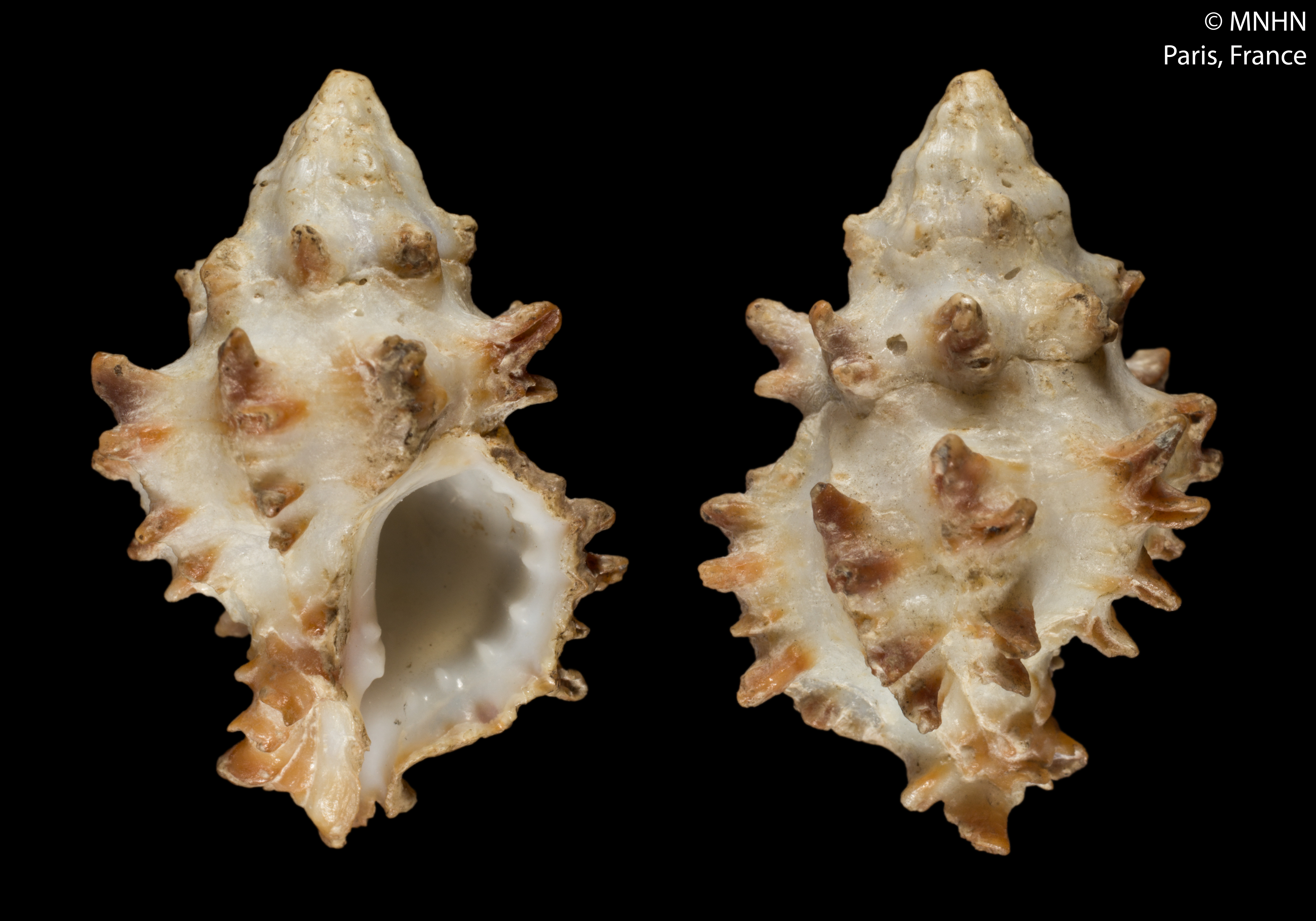
- Attiliosa caledonica

Scientific classification
- Kingdom: Animalia
- Phylum: Mollusca
- Class: Gastropoda
- Subclass: Caenogastropoda
- Order: Neogastropoda
- Family: Muricidae
- Genus: Attiliosa
- Species: A. caledonica

Binomial name
- Attiliosa caledonica (Jousseaume, 1881)

Synonyms
- Muricidea caledonica Jousseaume, 1881

= Attiliosa caledonica =

Species of gastropod

Attiliosa caledonica is a species of sea snail, a marine gastropod mollusc in the family Muricidae, the murex snails or rock snails.

== Description ==
The length of the holotype attains 26.2 mm, its diameter 19.0 mm; length of the siphonal canal: 6–7 mm; length of the aperture: 10 mm; width of the aperture: 5 mm

(Original description in Latin) The shell is subfusiform (tapering at both ends), spiny, solid, and white. The spire is conical and elongately turbinate, ending in a sharp apex. The suture is linear and flexuous. There are nine inflated, rounded whorls, which are armed with seven varices (prominent ridges). These varices have short spines; on the upper whorls, there is often only a single, very short spine, while on the body whorl, there are four or five thick, channeled spines.

The aperture is oval, dilated, and white. The upper margin of the peristome is briefly fused and callous; the columellar lip is spreading and smooth, while the lower part is bidentate (having two teeth); the outer lip is crenated (notched). The siphonal canal is short and curved.

== Distribution ==
This marine species occurs off New Caledonia.
