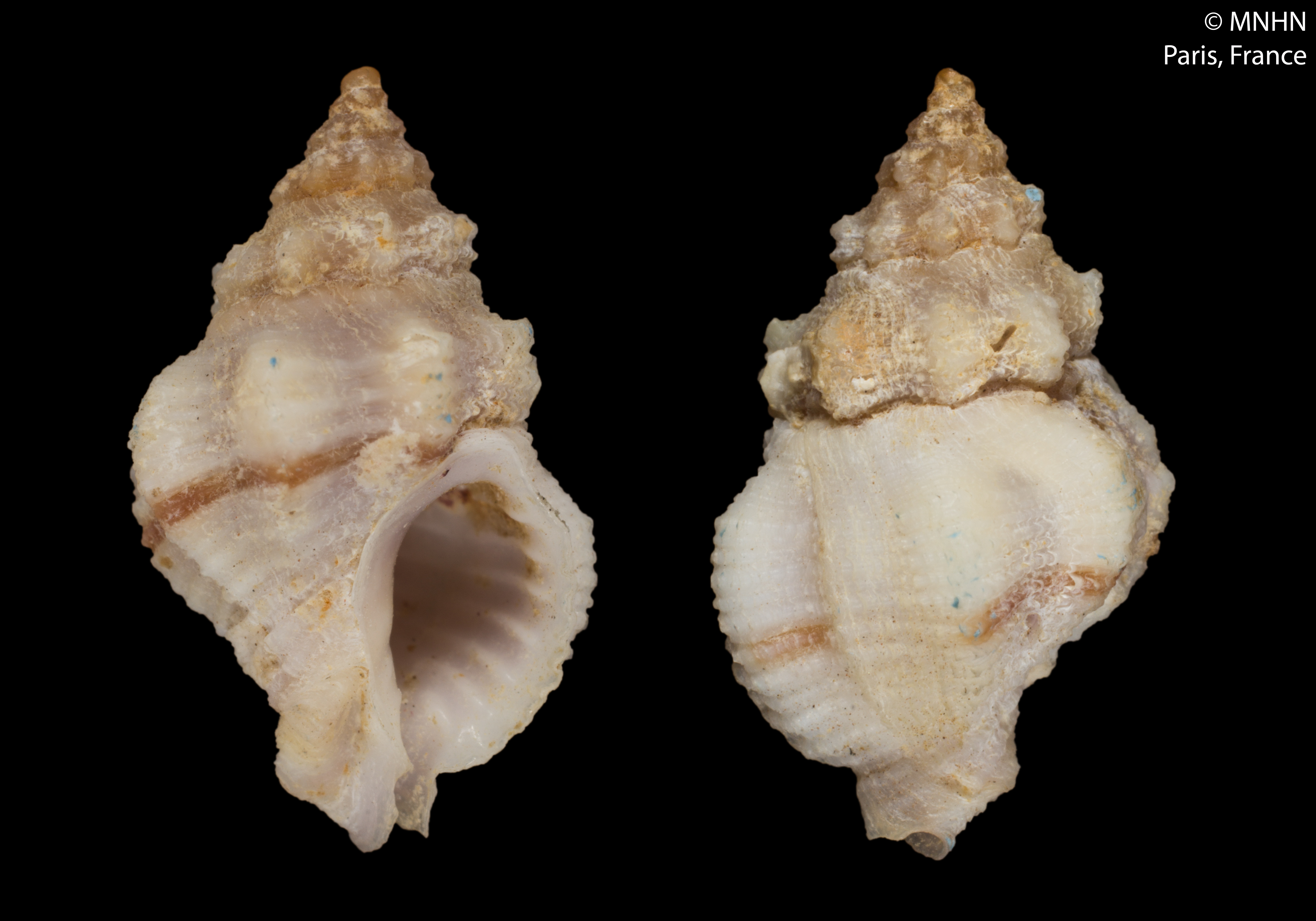

Scientific classification
- Kingdom: Animalia
- Phylum: Mollusca
- Class: Gastropoda
- Subclass: Caenogastropoda
- Order: Neogastropoda
- Family: Muricidae
- Genus: Attiliosa
- Species: A. goreensis

Binomial name
- Attiliosa goreensis Houart, 1993

= Attiliosa goreensis =

Species of gastropod

Attiliosa goreensis is a species of sea snail, a marine gastropod mollusc in the family Muricidae, the murex snails or rock snails.

== Description ==
The length of the holotype attains 15 mm.

== Distribution ==
Tjhis marine species occurs off Senegal.
