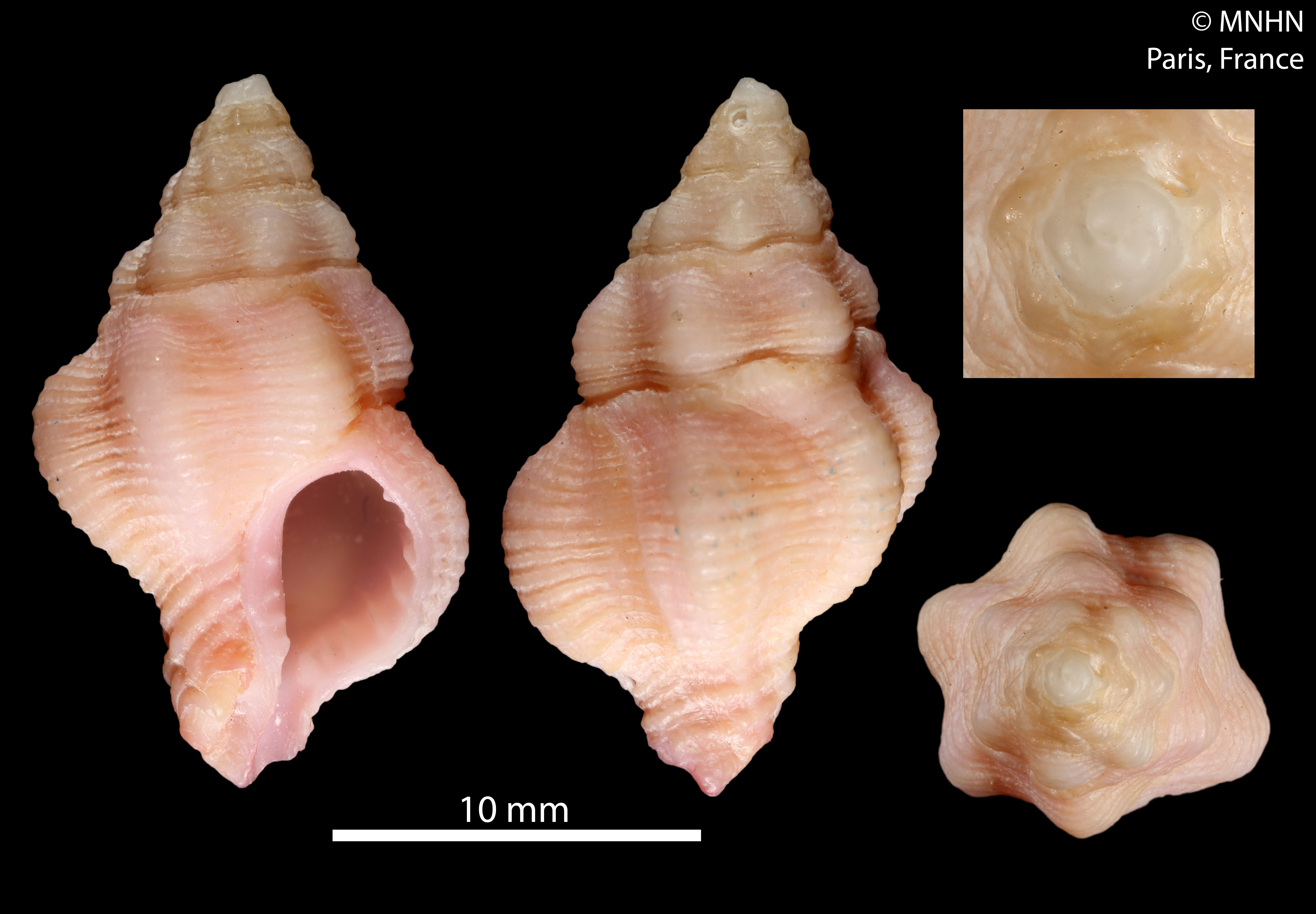
- Shell of Attiliosa bozzettii (paratype at MNHN, Paris)

Scientific classification
- Kingdom: Animalia
- Phylum: Mollusca
- Class: Gastropoda
- Subclass: Caenogastropoda
- Order: Neogastropoda
- Family: Muricidae
- Genus: Attiliosa
- Species: A. bozzettii

Binomial name
- Attiliosa bozzettii Houart, 1993

= Attiliosa bozzettii =

Species of gastropod

Attiliosa bozzettii is a species of sea snail, a marine gastropod mollusc in the family Muricidae, the murex snails or rock snails.

== Description ==
The length of the holotype attains 17.0 mm, its diameter is 10.1 mm.
