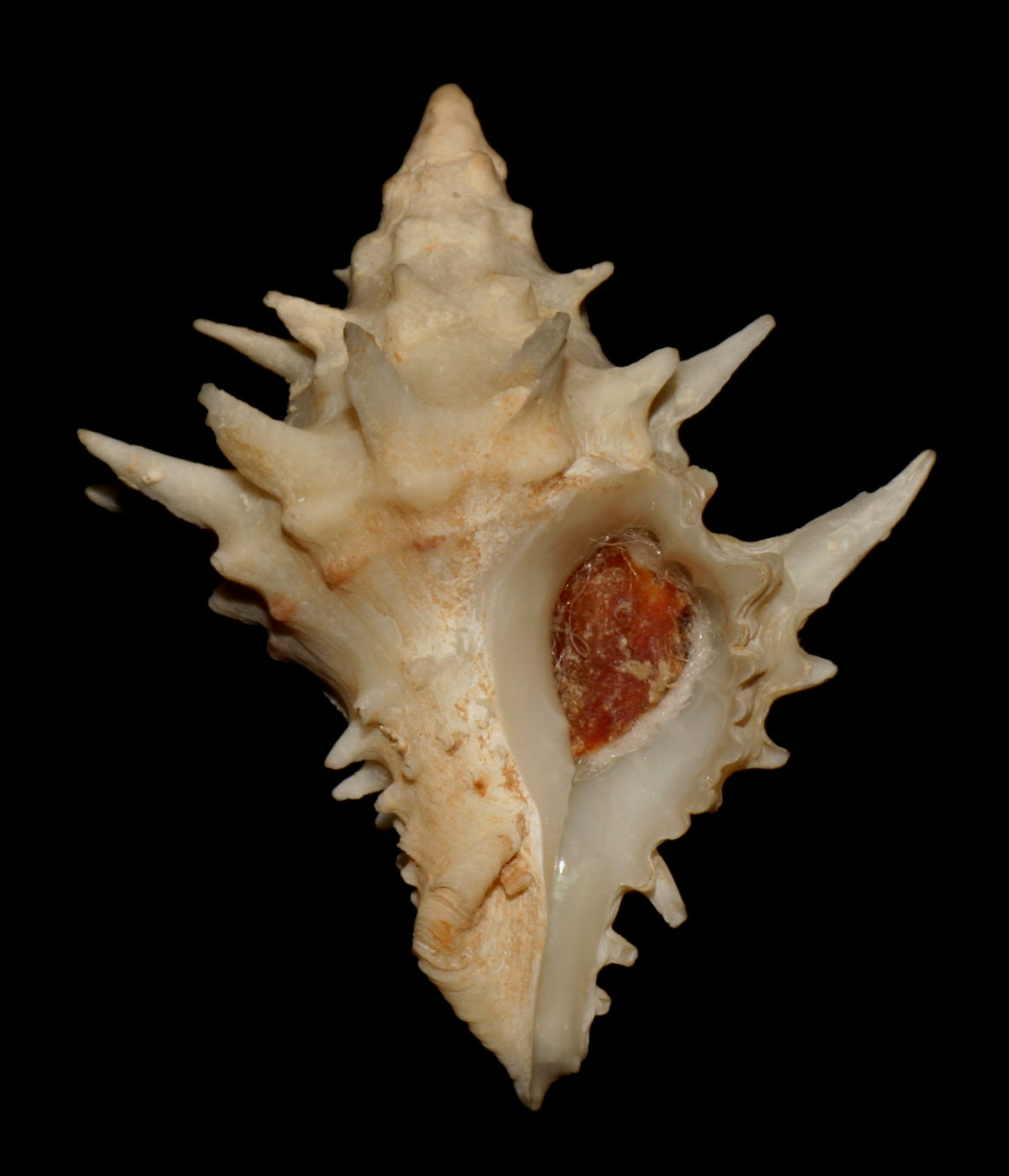
- A shell and operculum of Acanthotrophon carduus (Broderip, 1833), 23.1 mm in length, Dredged 240 ft. off of Medidora Island, Panama

Scientific classification
- Kingdom: Animalia
- Phylum: Mollusca
- Class: Gastropoda
- Subclass: Caenogastropoda
- Order: Neogastropoda
- Family: Muricidae
- Genus: Acanthotrophon
- Species: A. carduus

Binomial name
- Acanthotrophon carduus (Broderip, 1833)

Synonyms
- Murex carduus Broderip, 1833

= Acanthotrophon carduus =

Species of gastropod

Acanthotrophon carduus is a species of sea snail, a marine gastropod mollusk in the family Muricidae, which includes the murex snails or rock snails. It belongs to the genus Acanthotrophon.

== Description ==
The shell is dull white in color with a relatively coarse scaley sculpture consisting of rows of spines with one or two longer spines near the aperture. This taxon is placed in the Trophoninae rather than the Coraliophilidae because it has a radula. Compare with Acanthotrophon sentus. Length 25 mm, diameter 16 mm.

== Distribution ==
This species is found subtidally in deep water from Mazatlan, Mexico to Peru, occurring mostly offshore.
