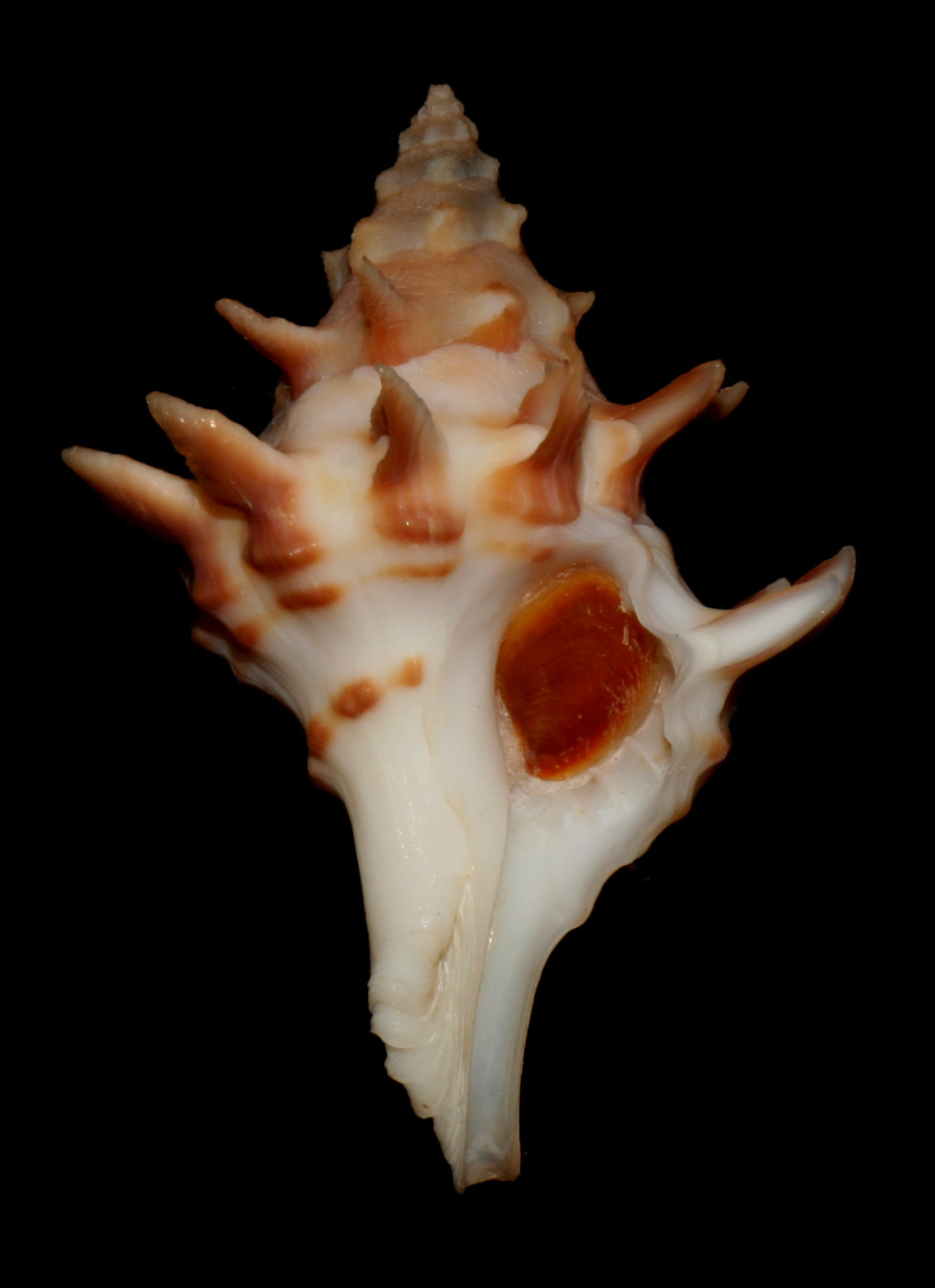
- A shell and operculum of Acanthotrophon sentus Berry, 1969, 27.6 mm in length, dredged 240–300 ft. off Kativa Island, Panama

Scientific classification
- Kingdom: Animalia
- Phylum: Mollusca
- Class: Gastropoda
- Subclass: Caenogastropoda
- Order: Neogastropoda
- Family: Muricidae
- Genus: Acanthotrophon
- Species: A. sentus

Binomial name
- Acanthotrophon sentus Berry, 1969

= Acanthotrophon sentus =

Species of gastropod

Acanthotrophon sentus is a species of sea snail, a marine gastropod mollusc in the family Muricidae in the genus Acanthotrophon, the murex snails or rock snails.

== Description ==
The base color of the shell is bright white and its sculpture is coarse with numerous stout spines which are paired in two rows at the periphery. The tips of the spines in some specimens are brown in color. Compare with Acanthotrophon carduus which has more numerous spines and is dull white in color. Length 20 mm, diameter 15 mm.

== Distribution ==
Found subtidally in deep water from Academy Bay, Santa Cruz Island, California to Galápagos Islands.
