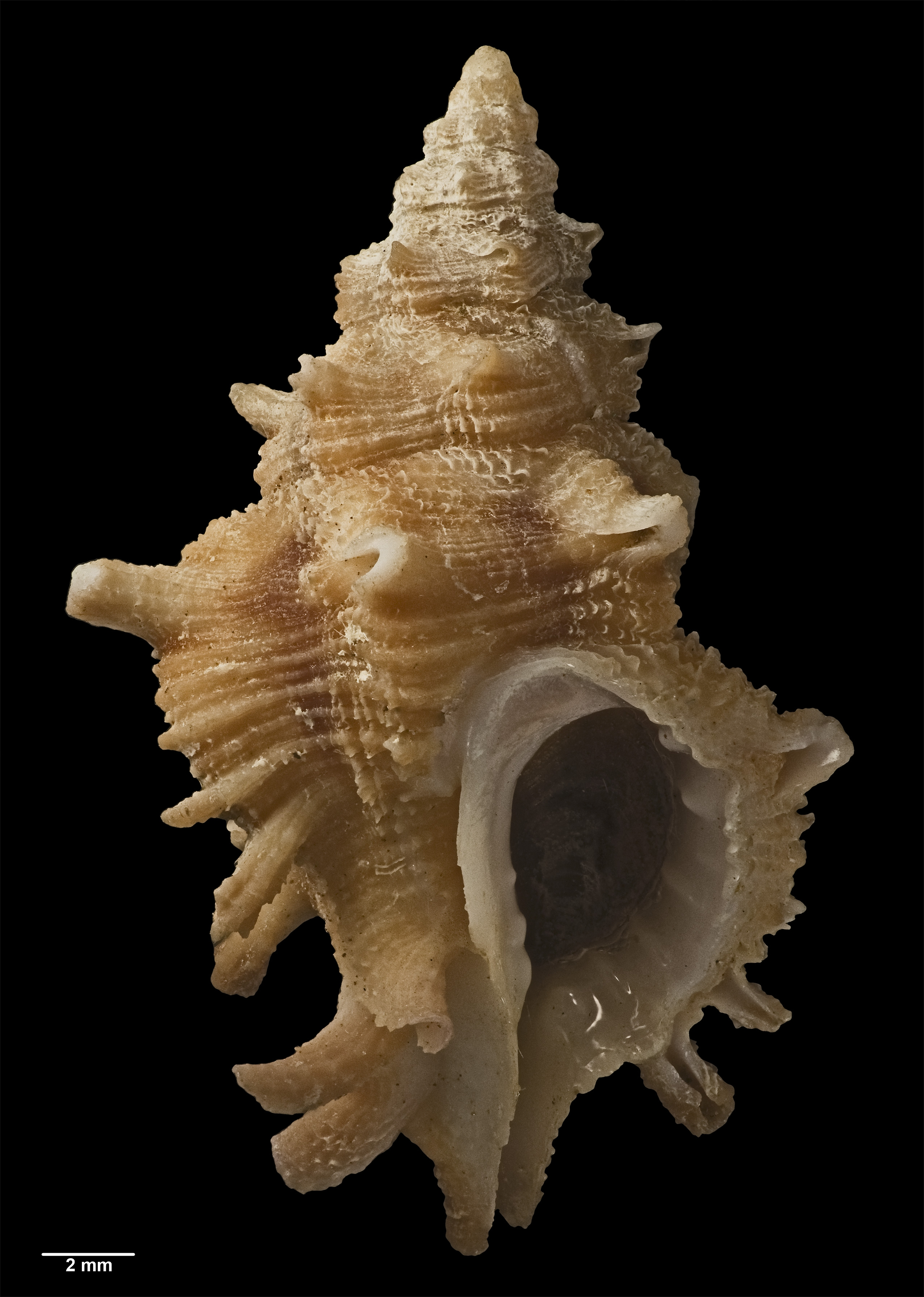

Scientific classification
- Kingdom: Animalia
- Phylum: Mollusca
- Class: Gastropoda
- Subclass: Caenogastropoda
- Order: Neogastropoda
- Family: Muricidae
- Genus: Attiliosa
- Species: A. orri

Binomial name
- Attiliosa orri (Cernohorsky, 1976)

Synonyms
- Muricopsis orri Cernohorsky, 1976

= Attiliosa orri =

Species of gastropod

Attiliosa orri is a species of sea snail, a marine gastropod mollusc in the family Muricidae, the murex snails or rock snails.

== Description ==
The length of the holotype attains 27.1 mm, its diameter is 18.6 mm.

== Distribution ==
This marine species occurs off the Andaman and Nicobar Islands.
