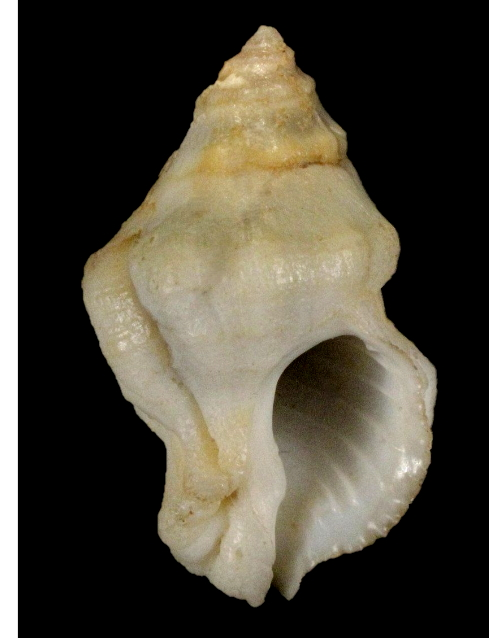
- Shell of Attiliosa nodulosa (specimen at Naturalis Biodiversity Center)

Scientific classification
- Kingdom: Animalia
- Phylum: Mollusca
- Class: Gastropoda
- Subclass: Caenogastropoda
- Order: Neogastropoda
- Family: Muricidae
- Genus: Attiliosa
- Species: A. nodulosa

Binomial name
- Attiliosa nodulosa (A. Adams, 1854)

Synonyms
- Attiliosa incompta (S. S. Berry, 1960); Coralliophila incompta Berry, 1960; Peristernia nodulosa A. Adams, 1854

= Attiliosa nodulosa =

Species of gastropod

Attiliosa nodulosa is a species of sea snail, a marine gastropod mollusc in the family Muricidae, the murex snails or rock snails.

== Description ==
The length of the holotype attains 31.5 mm, its diameter 19 mm.

(Original description in Latin) The shell is ovate-fusiform and umbilicate (having a small navel-like depression). It is whitish and wax-colored, nearly smooth, and marked by faint transverse grooves and longitudinal knot-like folds. The spire is pyramidal and is encircled at the sutures by a row of small nodules.

The body whorl is obtusely angled in the middle. The aperture is oval, and the columella is equipped with faint folds toward the front. The outer lip is strongly lirate (ridged) on the inside, with the front margin being angled. The siphonal canal is short and recurved.

== Distribution ==
This marine species occurs off Mexico, Panama and Ecuador.
