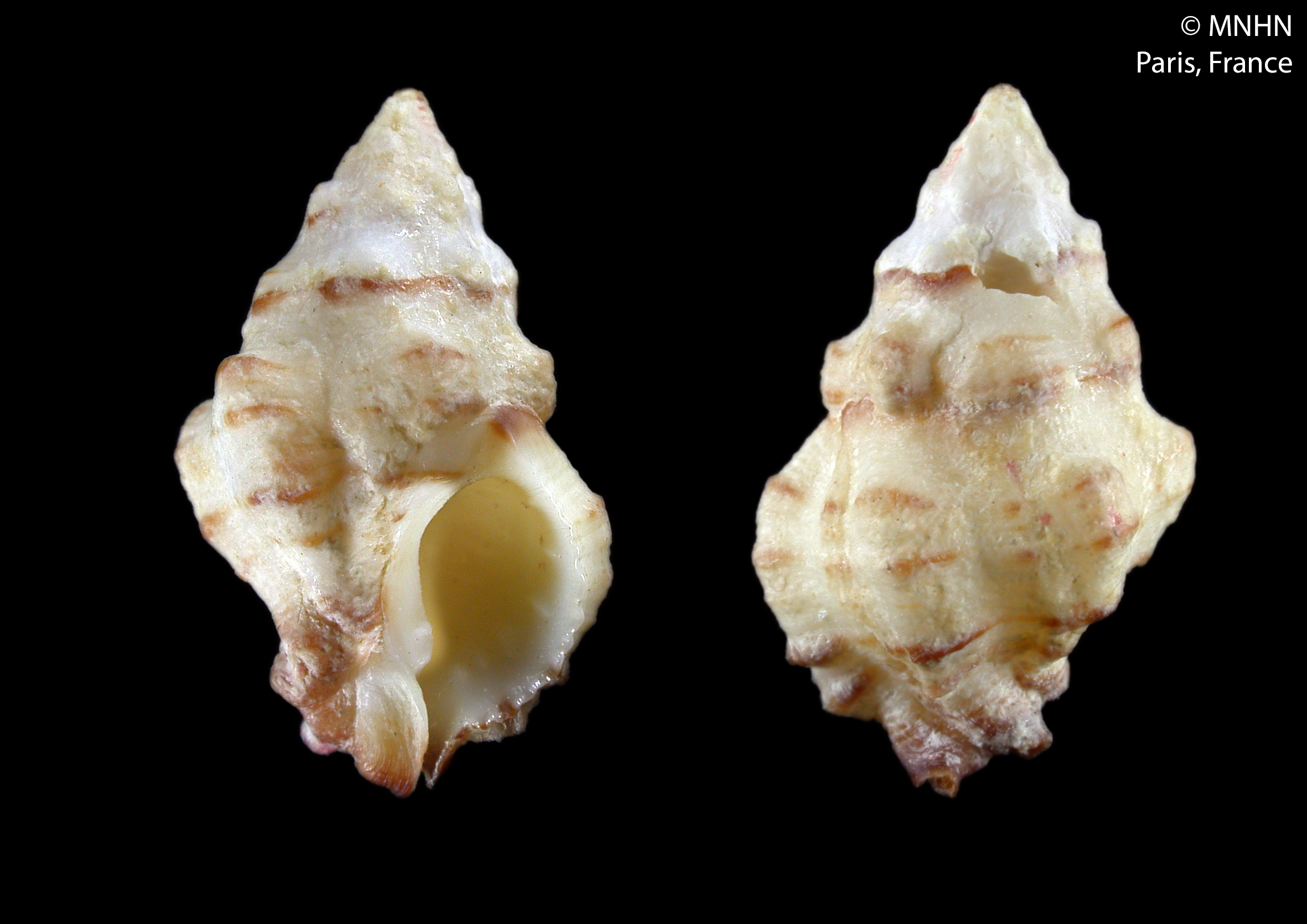
- Shell of Attiliosa aldridgei (specimen at MNHN, Paris)

Scientific classification
- Kingdom: Animalia
- Phylum: Mollusca
- Class: Gastropoda
- Subclass: Caenogastropoda
- Order: Neogastropoda
- Family: Muricidae
- Genus: Attiliosa
- Species: A. aldridgei

Binomial name
- Attiliosa aldridgei (Nowell-Usticke, 1969)

Synonyms
- Vasum aldridgei Nowell-Usticke, 1969

= Attiliosa aldridgei =

Species of gastropod

Attiliosa aldridgei is a species of sea snail, a marine gastropod mollusc in the family Muricidae, the murex snails or rock snails.

== Description ==
The length of the holotype attains 29.4 mm, its diameter is 20 mm.

== Distribution ==
This species occurs in the Caribbean Sea and off the Bahamas.
