= Attiliosa edingeri =

Scientific classification
- Kingdom: Animalia
- Phylum: Mollusca
- Class: Gastropoda
- Subclass: Caenogastropoda
- Order: Neogastropoda
- Family: Muricidae
- Genus: Attiliosa
- Species: A. edingeri

Binomial name
- Attiliosa edingeri Houart, 1998

Species of gastropod

Attiliosa edingeri is a species of sea snail, a marine gastropod mollusc in the family Muricidae, the murex snails or rock snails.

== Description ==
The length of the holotype attains 31.9 mm (1.255906 in), and its diameter is 18.1 mm (0.7125984 in).

== Distribution ==
This marine is endemic to Australia and occurs off Western Australia.
