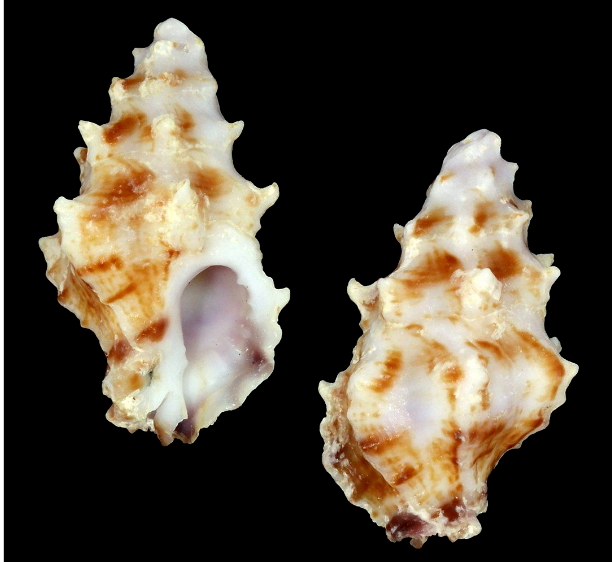
- Shell of Attiliosa kevani (specimen at the National Museum of Natural History, Smithsonian Institution)

Scientific classification
- Kingdom: Animalia
- Phylum: Mollusca
- Class: Gastropoda
- Subclass: Caenogastropoda
- Order: Neogastropoda
- Family: Muricidae
- Genus: Attiliosa
- Species: A. kevani

Binomial name
- Attiliosa kevani Vokes, 1999

= Attiliosa kevani =

Species of gastropod

Attiliosa kevani is a species of sea snail, a marine gastropod mollusc in the family Muricidae, the murex snails or rock snails.

== Description ==
The length of the holotype attains ranges 10-20 mm, its diameter around 11.0 mm. The shells of Attiliosa kevani are off-white, with orange-brown spots and spiny protrusions in a regular pattern.

== Distribution ==
This marine species occurs near the coast of Jamaica, Colombia, and Honduras.
