= Vexillum johnsoni =

Scientific classification
- Kingdom: Animalia
- Phylum: Mollusca
- Class: Gastropoda
- Subclass: Caenogastropoda
- Order: Neogastropoda
- Superfamily: Turbinelloidea
- Family: Costellariidae
- Genus: Vexillum
- Species: V. johnsoni

Binomial name
- Vexillum johnsoni Salisbury, 2019

Synonyms
- Vexillum (Pusia) johnsoni R. Salisbury, 2019 ·

Species of gastropod

Vexillum johnsoni is a species of sea snail, a marine gastropod mollusk, in the family Costellariidae, the ribbed miters.

== Distribution ==
This marine species occurs off the Marshall Islands.
