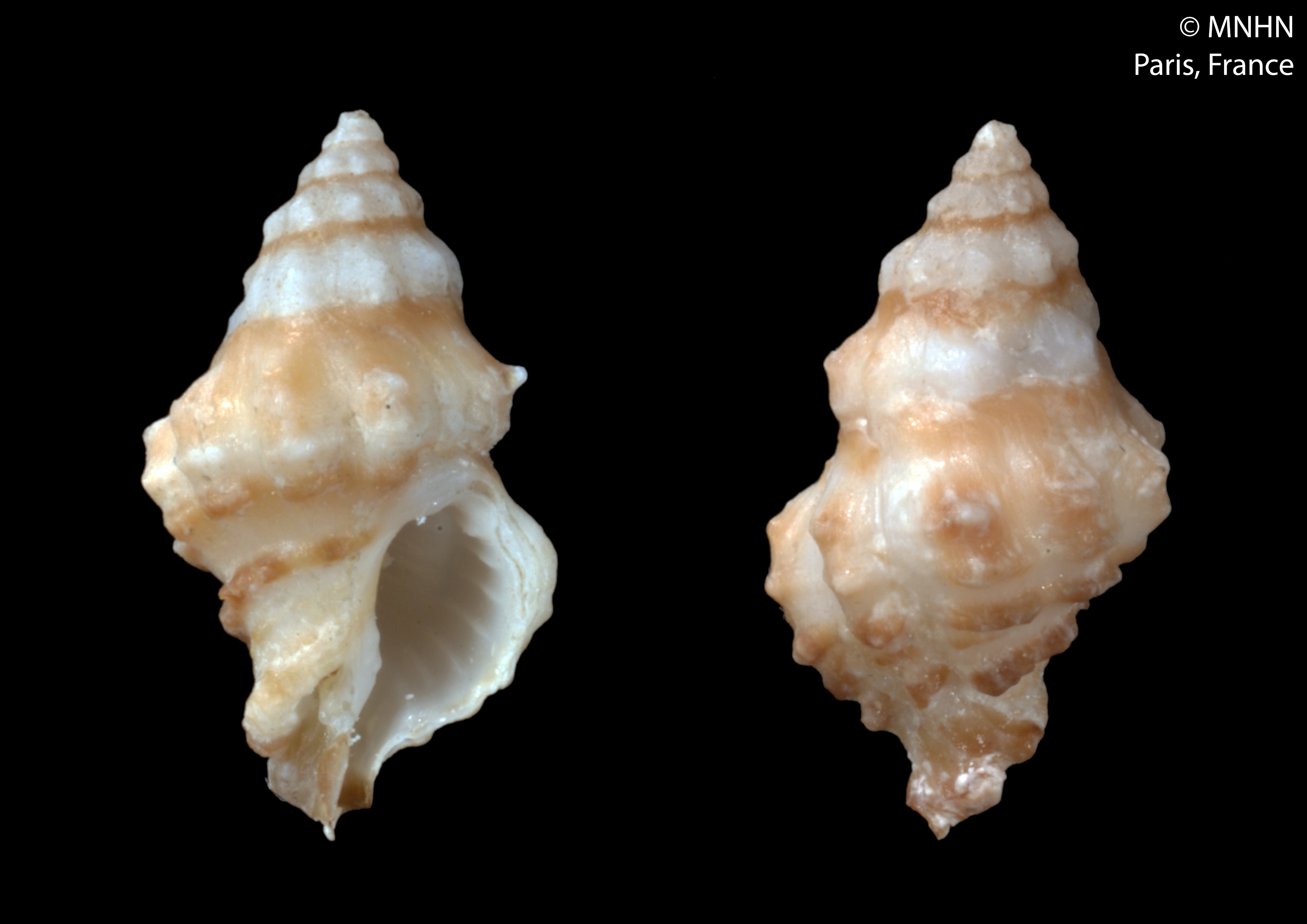
- Shell of Attiliosa laurecorbariae (specimen at the MNHN, Paris)

Scientific classification
- Kingdom: Animalia
- Phylum: Mollusca
- Class: Gastropoda
- Subclass: Caenogastropoda
- Order: Neogastropoda
- Family: Muricidae
- Genus: Attiliosa
- Species: A. laurecorbariae

Binomial name
- Attiliosa laurecorbariae Garrigues & D. Lamy, 2019

= Attiliosa laurecorbariae =

Species of gastropod

Attiliosa laurecorbariae is a species of sea snail, a marine gastropod mollusc in the family Muricidae, the murex snails or rock snails.

== Distribution ==
This marine species occurs off Martinique
