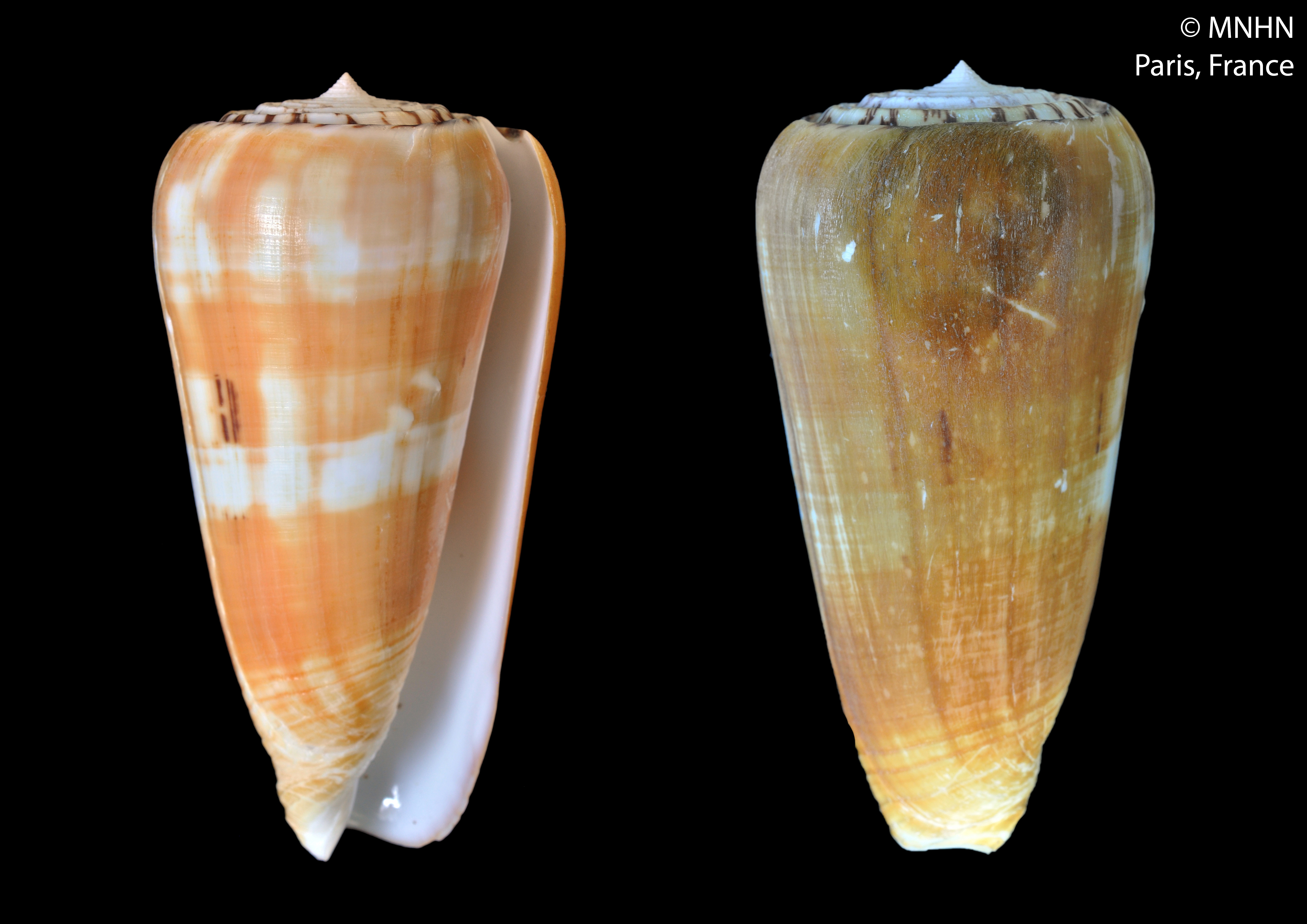
- Shell of Conus mascarenensis (holotype at MNHN, Paris)

Scientific classification
- Kingdom: Animalia
- Phylum: Mollusca
- Class: Gastropoda
- Subclass: Caenogastropoda
- Order: Neogastropoda
- Superfamily: Conoidea
- Family: Conidae
- Genus: Conus
- Species: C. mascarenensis

Binomial name
- Conus mascarenensis (Monnier & Limpalaër, 2019)

Synonyms
- Conus (Pionoconus) mascarenensis (Monnier & Limpalaër, 2019)· accepted, alternate representation; Pionoconus mascarenensis Monnier & Limpalaër, 2019

= Conus mascarenensis =

Species of sea snail

Conus mascarenensis is a species of sea snail, a marine gastropod mollusk in the family Conidae, the cone snails and their allies.

Like all species within the genus Conus, these marine snails are predatory and venomous. They are capable of stinging humans, therefore live ones should be handled carefully or not at all.

== Description ==
The size of the shell attains 110.6 mm. The shell is elongated and conical, with a relatively straight-sided profile typical of species within the Conus gubernator–leehmani complex. Its coloration consists of a pale to medium brown background, often overlaid with darker spiral bands and irregular blotches. The aperture is narrow and elongate, consistent with predatory cone snails.

== Distribution ==
This species occurs in the Indian Ocean off Réunion.
