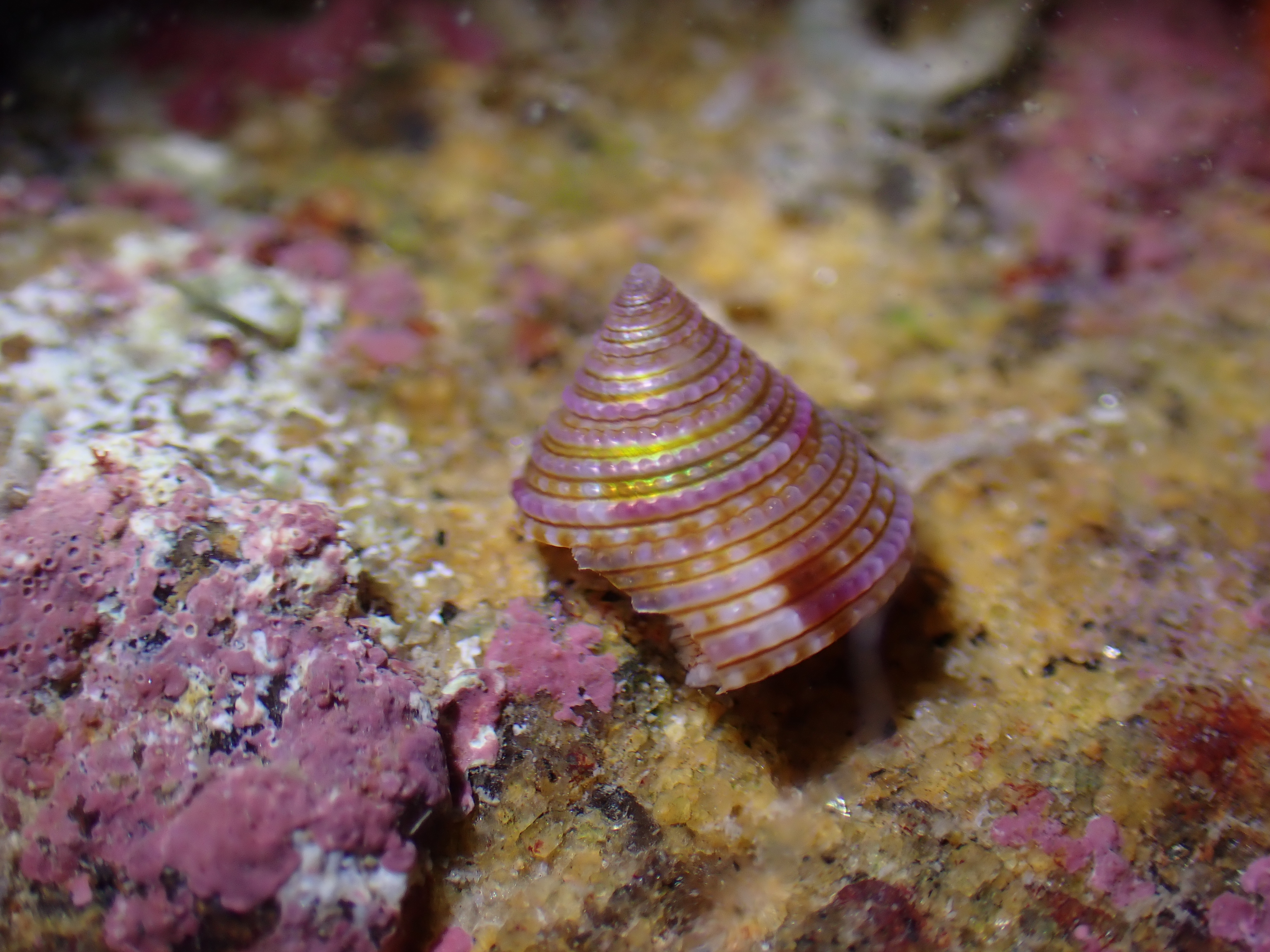

Scientific classification
- Kingdom: Animalia
- Phylum: Mollusca
- Class: Gastropoda
- Subclass: Vetigastropoda
- Order: Trochida
- Family: Calliostomatidae
- Genus: Calliostoma
- Species: C. hungi

Binomial name
- Calliostoma hungi S.-I Huang & I-F. Fu, 2019

= Calliostoma hungi =

Species of gastropod

Calliostoma hungi is a species of sea snail, a marine gastropod mollusk in the family Calliostomatidae. It was first described in 2019 along with several other species of Asian mollusk.

== Description ==
The size of the shell varies between 5.5 mm and 8 mm.

== Distribution ==
This marine species occurs off Kinmen, Taiwan Strait.
