= Calliostoma valkuri =

Scientific classification
- Kingdom: Animalia
- Phylum: Mollusca
- Class: Gastropoda
- Subclass: Vetigastropoda
- Order: Trochida
- Family: Calliostomatidae
- Subfamily: Calliostomatinae
- Genus: Calliostoma
- Species: C. valkuri

Binomial name
- Calliostoma valkuri Cavallari, Salvador, Dornellas & Simone, 2019

Species of gastropod

Calliostoma valkuri is a species of sea snail, a marine gastropod mollusk in the family Calliostomatidae.
