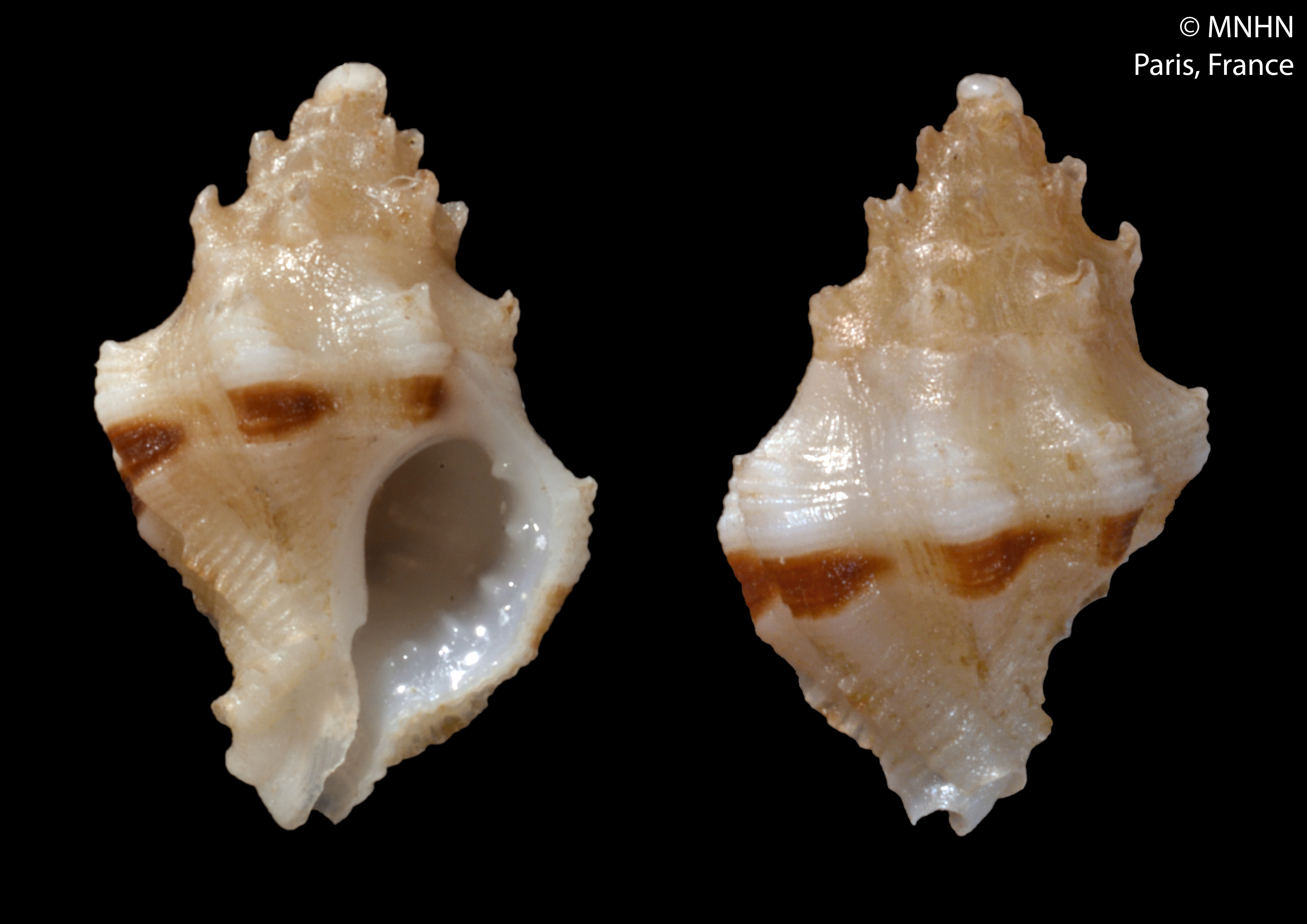
- Shell of Attiliosa pygmaea (paratype at MNHN, Paris)

Scientific classification
- Kingdom: Animalia
- Phylum: Mollusca
- Class: Gastropoda
- Subclass: Caenogastropoda
- Order: Neogastropoda
- Family: Muricidae
- Genus: Attiliosa
- Species: A. pygmaea

Binomial name
- Attiliosa pygmaea Garrigues & D. Lamy, 2019

= Attiliosa pygmaea =

Species of gastropod

Attiliosa pygmaea is a species of sea snail, a marine gastropod mollusc in the family Muricidae, the murex snails or rock snails.

== Distribution ==
This marine species occurs off Martinique.
