= Cyclimetula altior =

Scientific classification
- Kingdom: Animalia
- Phylum: Mollusca
- Class: Gastropoda
- Subclass: Caenogastropoda
- Order: Neogastropoda
- Family: Colubrariidae
- Genus: Cyclimetula
- Species: C. altior

Binomial name
- Cyclimetula altior S.-I Huang & M.-H. Lin, 2019

Species of gastropods

Cyclimetula altior is a species of sea snails, marine gastropod mollusks in the family Colubrariidae.
