= Calliostoma apicisuperi =

Scientific classification
- Kingdom: Animalia
- Phylum: Mollusca
- Class: Gastropoda
- Subclass: Vetigastropoda
- Order: Trochida
- Family: Calliostomatidae
- Genus: Calliostoma
- Species: C. apicisuperi

Binomial name
- Calliostoma apicisuperi S.-I Huang & I-F. Fu, 2019

Species of gastropod

Calliostoma apicisuperi is a species of sea snail, a marine gastropod mollusk in the family Calliostomatidae.

== Description ==
The size of the shell varies between 6.8 mm and 20 mm.

== Distribution ==
The locality of this marine species is in northeastern Taiwan.
