= Cyclimetula =

Scientific classification
- Kingdom: Animalia
- Phylum: Mollusca
- Class: Gastropoda
- Subclass: Caenogastropoda
- Order: Neogastropoda
- Family: Colubrariidae
- Genus: Cyclimetula; S.-I Huang & M.-H. Lin, 2019

Genus of gastropods

Cyclimetula is a genus of sea snails, marine gastropod mollusks in the family Colubrariidae.

== Species ==
Species within the genus Cyclimetula include:

- Cyclimetula altior S.-I Huang & M.-H. Lin, 2019
- Cyclimetula hsui S.-I Huang & M.-H. Lin, 2019
