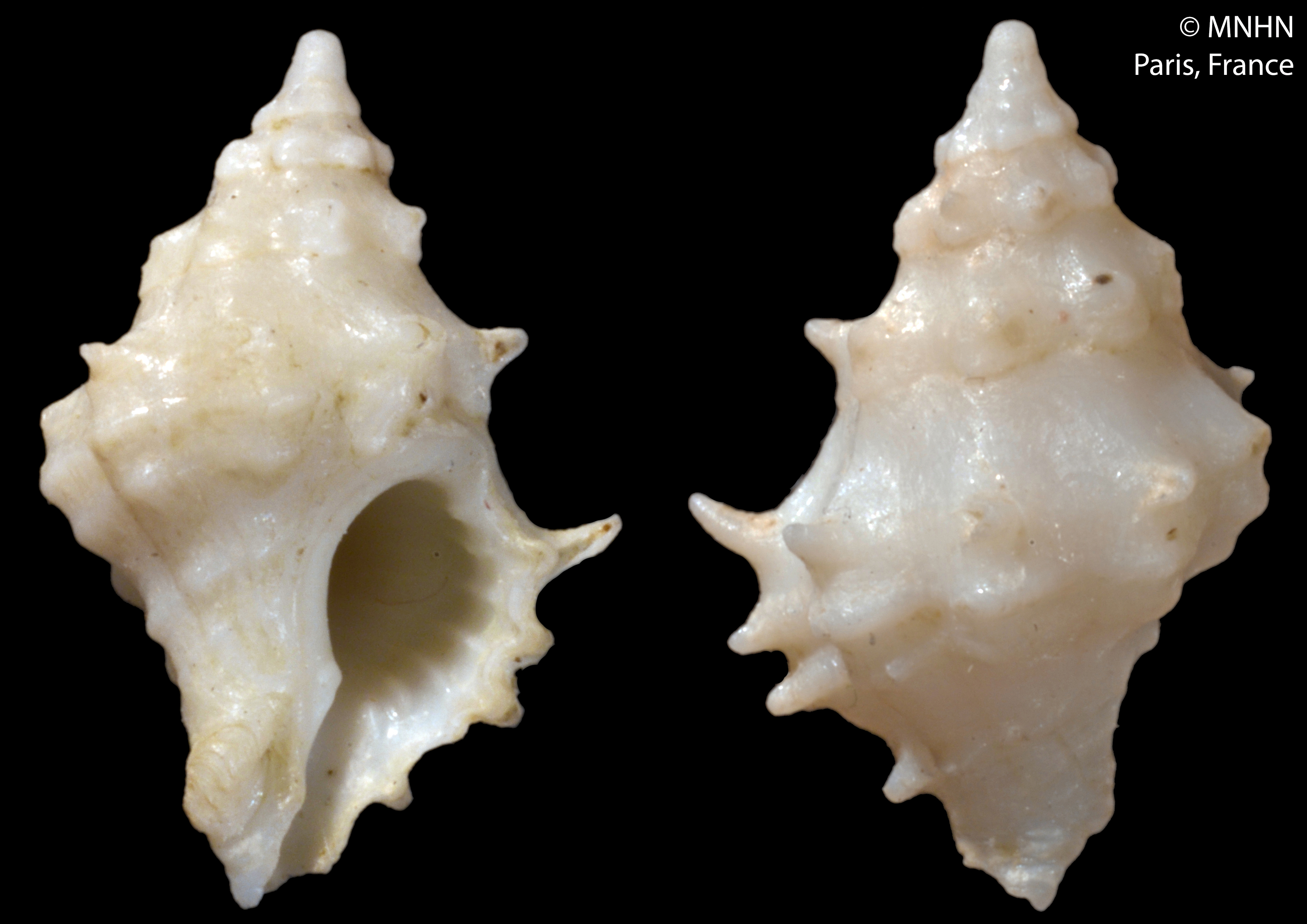
- Shell of Acanthotrophon striatoides (specien at MNHN, Paris)

Scientific classification
- Kingdom: Animalia
- Phylum: Mollusca
- Class: Gastropoda
- Subclass: Caenogastropoda
- Order: Neogastropoda
- Family: Muricidae
- Genus: Acanthotrophon
- Species: A. striatoides

Binomial name
- Acanthotrophon striatoides Vokes, 1980

= Acanthotrophon striatoides =

Species of gastropod

Acanthotrophon striatoides is a species of sea snail, a marine gastropod mollusk in the family Muricidae, the murex snails or rock snails.
