= Vexillum jeanetteae =

Scientific classification
- Kingdom: Animalia
- Phylum: Mollusca
- Class: Gastropoda
- Subclass: Caenogastropoda
- Order: Neogastropoda
- Superfamily: Turbinelloidea
- Family: Costellariidae
- Genus: Vexillum
- Species: V. jeanetteae

Binomial name
- Vexillum jeanetteae Salisbury, 2019

Synonyms
- Vexillum (Pusia) jeanetteae R. Salisbury, 2019 ·

Species of gastropod

Vexillum jeanetteae is a species of sea snail, a marine gastropod mollusk, in the family Costellariidae, the ribbed miters.

== Distribution ==
This marine species occurs off the Marshall Islands.
