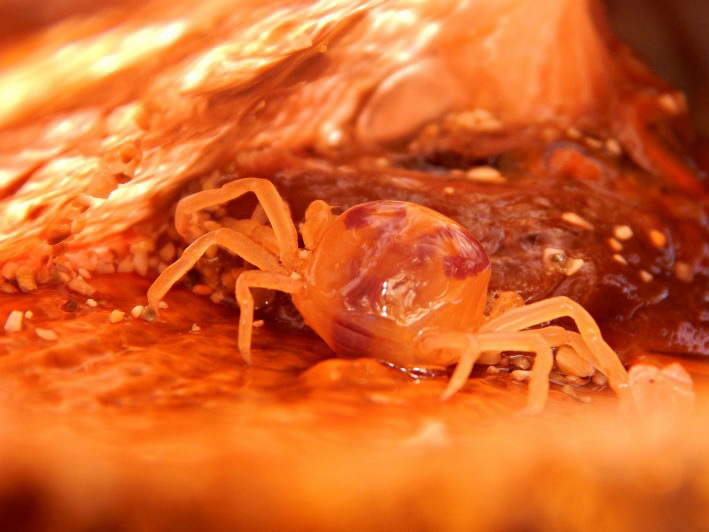
- Pinnotheres pisum

Scientific classification
- Kingdom: Animalia
- Phylum: Arthropoda
- Clade: Pancrustacea
- Class: Malacostraca
- Order: Decapoda
- Suborder: Pleocyemata
- Clade: Reptantia
- Infraorder: Brachyura
- Section: Eubrachyura
- Subsection: Thoracotremata
- Superfamily: Pinnotheroidea; De Haan, 1833

Families
- Parapinnixidae; Pinnotheridae; Tetriasidae

= Pinnotheroidea =

Superfamily of crabs

Pinnotheroidea is a superfamily of true crabs. Species of this group are symbionts of other invertebrates, including other crustaceans, mollusks, annelids, echinoderms and tunicates.

== Taxonomy ==
The superfamily used to include families Pinnotheridae and Aphanodactylidae, but phylogenetic analyses have shown they are not closely related, prompting the reassignment of the latter to a distinct superfamily, Aphanodactyloidea. Tsang & Naruse (2023) divided the remaining pinnotheroids into three families by establishing Parapinnixidae and Tetriasidae as families equal in status to Pinnotheridae sensu stricto.
