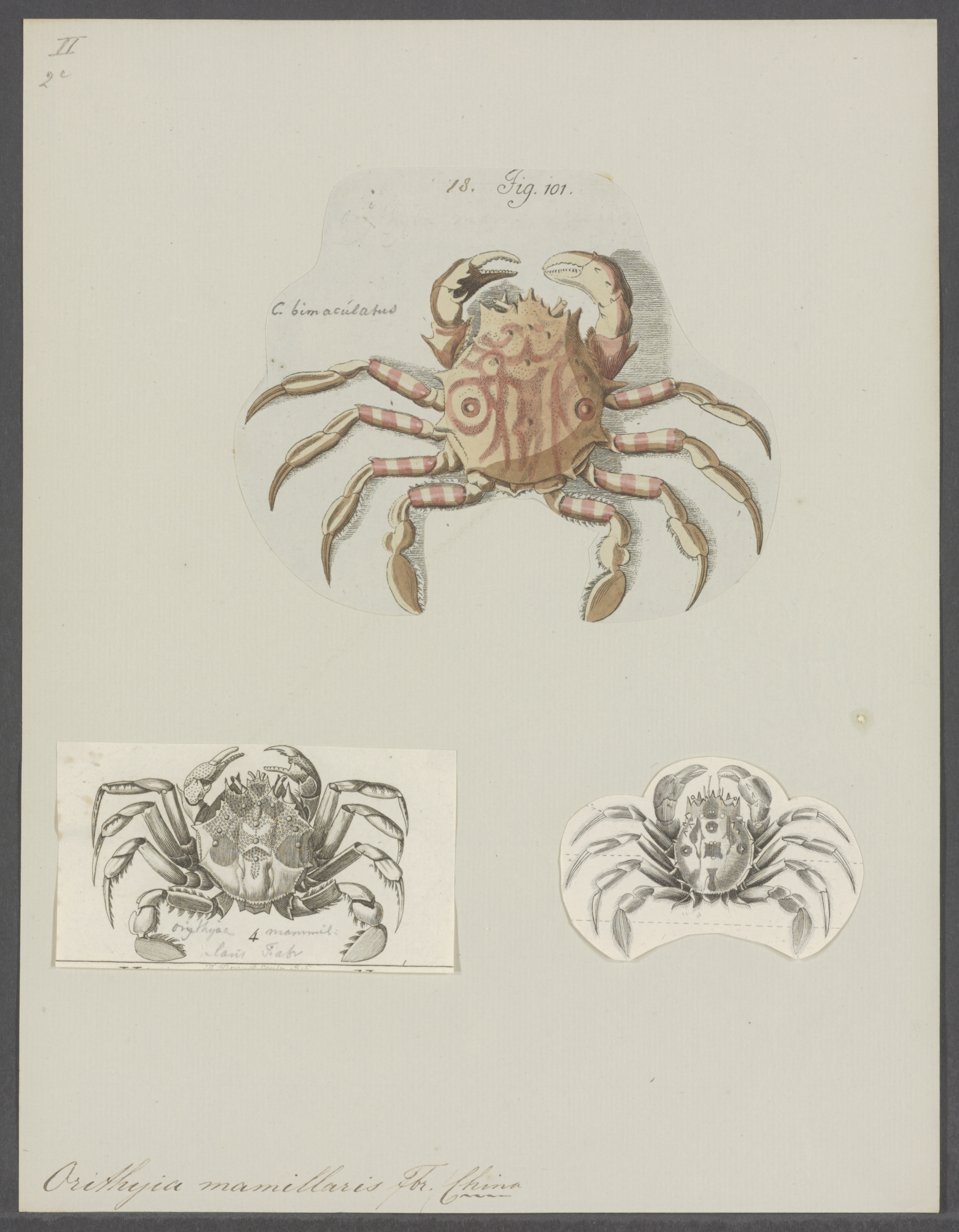

Scientific classification
- Kingdom: Animalia
- Phylum: Arthropoda
- Clade: Pancrustacea
- Class: Malacostraca
- Order: Decapoda
- Suborder: Pleocyemata
- Infraorder: Brachyura
- Section: Eubrachyura
- Subsection: Heterotremata
- Superfamily: Orithyioidea; Dana, 1852
- Family: Orithyiidae; Dana, 1852
- Genus: Orithyia; Fabricius, 1798
- Species: O. sinica

Binomial name
- Orithyia sinica (Linnaeus, 1771)

Synonyms
- Cancer sinicus Linnaeus, 1771; Cancer bimaculatus Herbst, 1790; Cancer mammillaris Fabricius, 1793

= Orithyia sinica =

Species of crab

Orithyia sinica, sometimes called tiger crab or the tiger face crab, is a "singularly unusual" species of crab, whose characteristics warrant its separation into a separate genus, family and even superfamily, having previously been included in the Dorippoidea or Leucosioidea. Its larvae, for instance, are unlike those of any other crab.

== Description ==
Orithyia sinica is a distinctive species, with stripes on the legs, and prominent eyespots on the carapace; the females' abdomen is unusually narrow, leaving the vulvae exposed. The legs are flattened at the end, and this is an adaptation to digging, not swimming.

== Distribution and fishery ==
Orithyia sinica is found along the coast of mainland Asia from South Korea to Hong Kong, but is missing from the nearby islands, such as Taiwan, the Ryukyu Islands and Japan, even though the intervening waters are shallow and the crab's larvae are planktonic. Throughout its range, O. sinica is fished on a small scale and commands high prices.

== Etymology ==
The name Orithyia (also spelt Orithuja) commemorates Orithyia, daughter of Erechtheus, King of Athens.
