= Dilocarcinus pagei =

Scientific classification
- Kingdom: Animalia
- Phylum: Arthropoda
- Clade: Pancrustacea
- Class: Malacostraca
- Order: Decapoda
- Suborder: Pleocyemata
- Infraorder: Brachyura
- Family: Trichodactylidae
- Genus: Dilocarcinus
- Species: D. pagei

Binomial name
- Dilocarcinus pagei Stimpson, 1861

Species of crab

Dilocarcinus pagei is a species of freshwater crab.

== Description ==
Dilocarcinus pagei is a widespread South American freshwater crab species found in Brazilian river basins, featuring a smooth, convex, carapace, and a color range from light brown in juveniles to intense red or orange in adults. It is a key omnivorous and opportunistic scavenger in its range.

== Range ==
It is found in most of tropical South America.
