= Componocancer =

Componocancer Temporal range: Albian

Scientific classification
- Kingdom: Animalia
- Phylum: Arthropoda
- Clade: Pancrustacea
- Class: Malacostraca
- Order: Decapoda
- Suborder: Pleocyemata
- Infraorder: Brachyura
- Section: Eubrachyura
- Subsection: Heterotremata
- Superfamily: †Componocancroidea; Feldmann, Schweitzer & Green, 2008
- Family: †Componocancridae; Feldmann, Schweitzer & Green, 2008
- Genus: †Componocancer; Feldmann, Schweitzer & Green, 2008
- Species: †C. robertii

Binomial name
- †Componocancer robertii Feldmann, Schweitzer & Green, 2008

Genus of crabs

Componocancer roberti is a species of fossil crab described in 2008. It lived in the Albian age (Early Cretaceous) in what is now Montana. The species is unlike any other described crab, and is therefore placed in its own family and superfamily.
