= Linnaeoxantho =

Scientific classification
- Kingdom: Animalia
- Phylum: Arthropoda
- Clade: Pancrustacea
- Class: Malacostraca
- Order: Decapoda
- Suborder: Pleocyemata
- Infraorder: Brachyura
- Subsection: Heterotremata
- Superfamily: Xanthoidea
- Family: Linnaeoxanthidae; Števčić, 2005
- Genus: Linnaeoxantho; Števčić, 2005
- Species: L. acanthomerus

Binomial name
- Linnaeoxantho acanthomerus (Rathbun, 1911)

Genus of crabs

Linnaeoxantho is a genus of crab, whose only species is Linnaeoxantho acanthomerus. Linnaeoxantho is the only genus of the family Linnaeoxanthidae.
