= Tanaocheles =

Scientific classification
- Kingdom: Animalia
- Phylum: Arthropoda
- Clade: Pancrustacea
- Class: Malacostraca
- Order: Decapoda
- Suborder: Pleocyemata
- Infraorder: Brachyura
- Section: Eubrachyura
- Subsection: Heterotremata
- Superfamily: Pilumnoidea
- Family: Tanaochelidae; Ng & Clark, 2000
- Genus: Tanaocheles; Kropp, 1984

Species
- Tanaocheles bidentata (Nobili 1901); Tanaocheles stenochilus Kropp, 1984

Genus of crabs

Tanaocheles is a genus of crabs, the only genus in the family Tanaochelidae. It contains two species, T. bidentata and T. stenochilus. The two species were formerly placed in different families, and they were only shown to be related, and placed in a new subfamily (now elevated to the taxonomic rank of family), in 2000.

== Tanaocheles bidentata ==
Originally described as Chlorodius bidentatus, and later called Chlorodiella bidentata, Tanaocheles bidentata was assigned for a long time to the Xanthidae.

== Tanaocheles stenochilus ==
Tanaocheles stenochilus was described in 1989 from material collected in Guam, where it lives among colonies of the stony coral Leptoseris gardineri. It was originally placed in the Trapeziidae.
