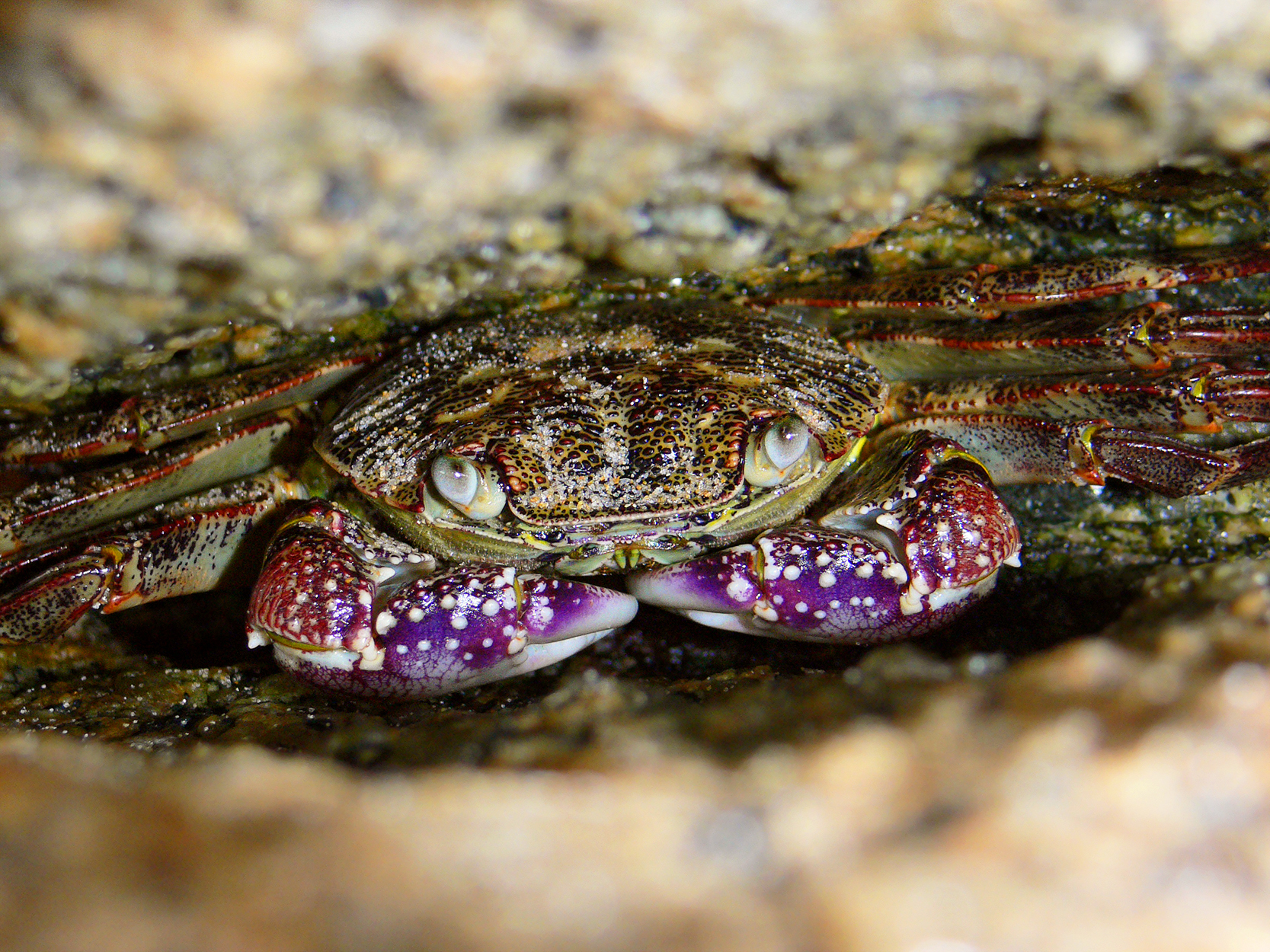
- Leptograpsus variegatus, Grapsidae

Scientific classification
- Kingdom: Animalia
- Phylum: Arthropoda
- Class: Malacostraca
- Order: Decapoda
- Suborder: Pleocyemata
- Infraorder: Brachyura
- Section: Eubrachyura
- Subsection: Thoracotremata; Guinot, 1977

Families
- See text

= Thoracotremata =

Clade of crabs

Thoracotremata is a clade of crabs, comprising those crabs in which the genital openings in both sexes are on the sternum, rather than on the legs. It comprises 17 families in four superfamilies .

== Evolution ==
Thoracotremata is the sister group to Heterotremata within the clade Eubrachyura, having diverged during the Cretaceous period. Eubrachyura itself is a subset of the larger clade Brachyura, which consists of all "true crabs". A summary of the high-level internal relationships within Brachyura can be shown in the cladogram below:

- Brachyura
  - Dromiacea
  - - - Raninoida
      - Cyclodorippoida
    - Eubrachyura
      - Heterotremata
      - Thoracotremata

The internal relationships within Thoracotremata are less certain, with many of the superfamilies found to be invalid. The proposed cladogram below is from analysis by Tsang et al, 2014:

- Thoracotremata
  - - Pinnotheridae
    - Dotillidae
  - - Percnidae
    - - - Xenograpsidae
        - Cryptochiridae
      - - - Ocypodidae
          - - Glyptograpsidae
            - Grapsidae
        - - - - Plagusiidae
              - Gecarcinidae
            - Sesarmidae
          - - Mictyridae
            - - Varunidae
              - Macrophthalmidae

== Superfamilies and families ==
- Ocypodoidea
  - Camptandriidae
  - Dotillidae
  - Heloeciidae
  - Macrophthalmidae
  - Mictyridae
  - Ocypodidae
  - Ucididae
  - Xenophthalmidae
- Pinnotheroidea
  - Pinnotheridae
- Cryptochiroidea
  - Cryptochiridae
- Grapsoidea
  - Gecarcinidae
  - Glyptograpsidae
  - Grapsidae
  - Plagusiidae
  - Sesarmidae
  - Varunidae
  - Xenograpsidae

However, recent studies have found the superfamilies Grapsoidea and Ocypodoidea to be polyphyletic and invalid.
