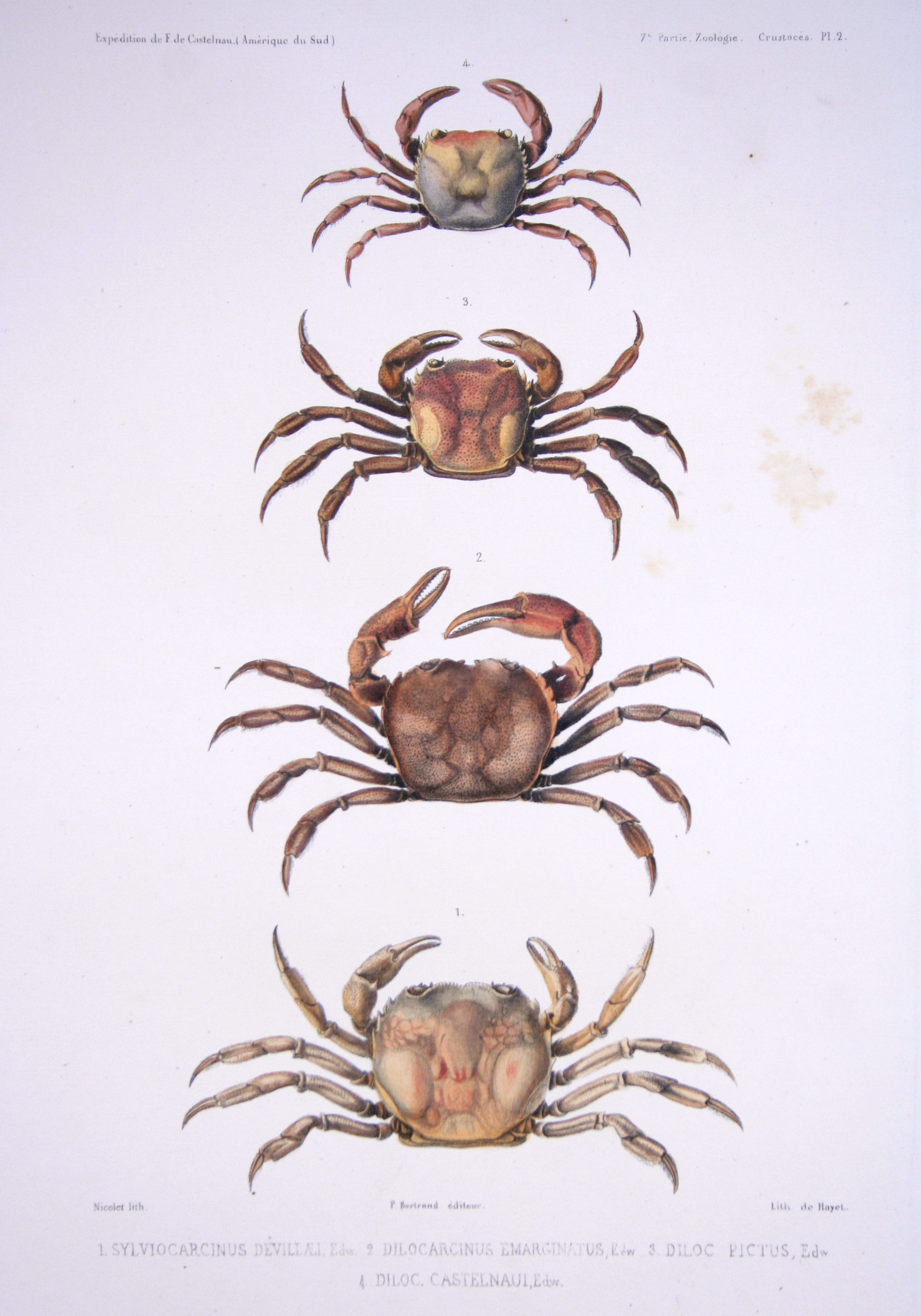

Scientific classification
- Kingdom: Animalia
- Phylum: Arthropoda
- Clade: Pancrustacea
- Class: Malacostraca
- Order: Decapoda
- Suborder: Pleocyemata
- Clade: Reptantia
- Infraorder: Brachyura
- Section: Eubrachyura
- Subsection: Heterotremata
- Superfamily: Trichodactyloidea; H. Milne-Edwards, 1835
- Family: Trichodactylidae; H. Milne-Edwards, 1835

= Trichodactylidae =

Trichodactylidae Temporal range: Miocene–Recent

Family of crabs

Trichodactylidae is a family of crabs, in its own superfamily, Trichodactyloidea. They are all freshwater animals from Central and South America, including some offshore islands, such as Ilhabela, São Paulo. Only one of the 50 species is known from the fossil record, Sylviocarcinus piriformis from the Miocene of Colombia. The family contains 15 genera in two subfamilies:

Subfamily Dilocarcininae Pretzmann, 1978

- Bottiella Magalhães & Türkay, 1996
- Dilocarcinus H. Milne-Edwards, 1853
- Forsteria Bott, 1969
- Fredilocarcinus Pretzmann, 1978
- Goyazana Bott, 1969
- Melocarcinus Magalhães & Türkay, 1996
- Moreirocarcinus Magalhães & Türkay, 1996
- Poppiana Bott, 1969
- Rotundovaldivia Pretzmann, 1968
- Sylviocarcinus H. Milne-Edwards, 1853
- Valdivia White, 1847
- Zilchiopsis Bott, 1969

Subfamily Trichodactylinae H. Milne-Edwards, 1853

- Avotrichodactylus Pretzmann, 1968
- Rodriguezia Bott, 1969
- Trichodactylus Latreille, 1829
