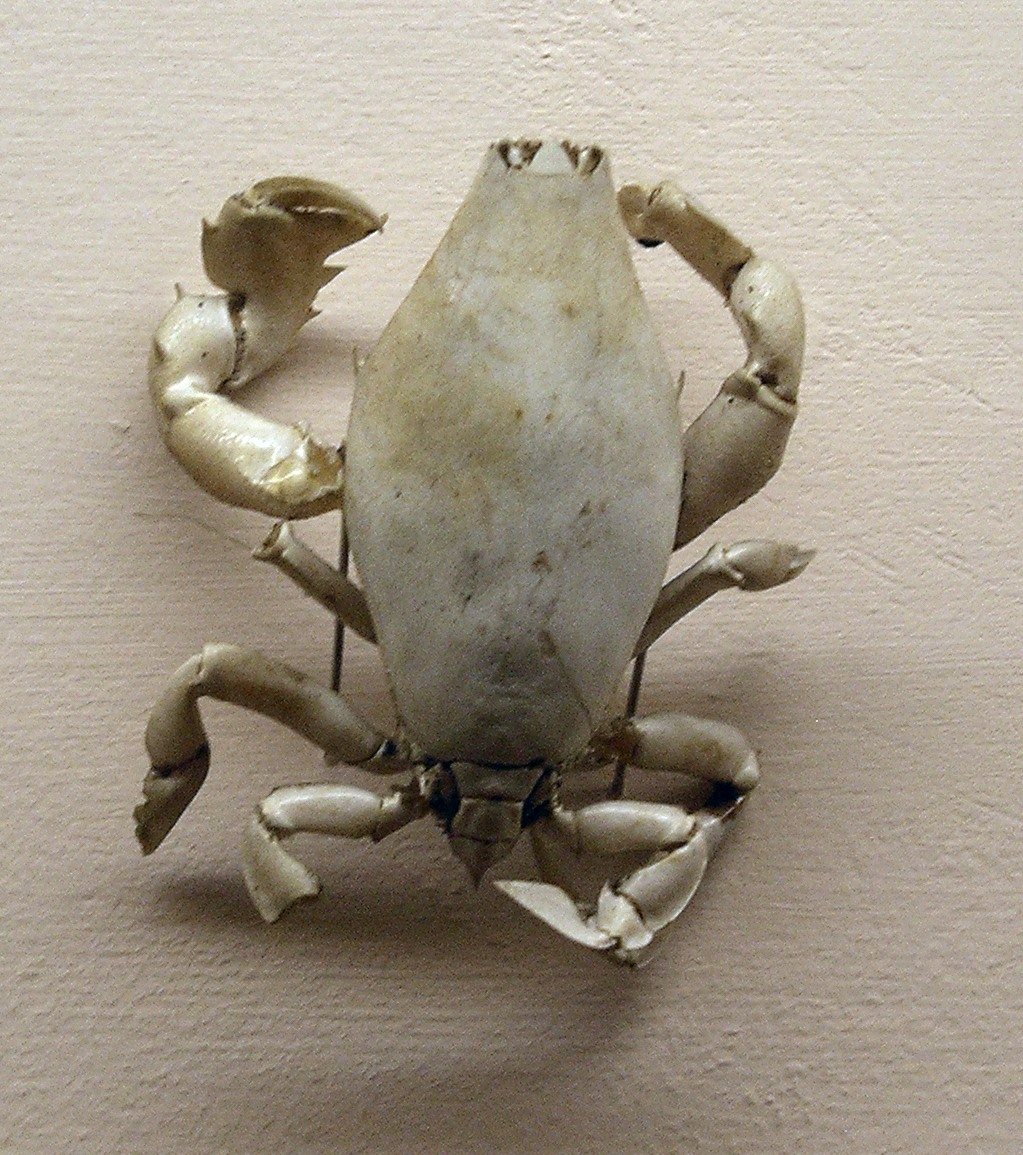
- Lyreidus tridentatus

Scientific classification
- Kingdom: Animalia
- Phylum: Arthropoda
- Class: Malacostraca
- Order: Decapoda
- Suborder: Pleocyemata
- Infraorder: Brachyura; De Haan, 1839
- Section: Raninoida; De Haan, 1839

Superfamilies
- Raninoidea; †Necrocarcinoidea; †Palaeocorystoidea

= Raninoida =

Superfamily of crabs

Raninoida is a taxonomic section of the crabs, containing a single extant superfamily, Raninoidea, and two extinct, Necrocarcinoidea and Palaeocorystoidea. This group of crabs is unlike most, with the abdomen not being folded under the thorax. As of 2009, it comprised 46 extant species, and nearly 200 species known only from fossils.

== Classification ==
Below is a cladogram showing Raninoidea's placement within Brachyura:

- Brachyura
  - Dromiacea
  - - - Raninoida
      - Cyclodorippoida
    - Eubrachyura
      - Heterotremata
      - Thoracotremata

The following subgroups are contained in section Raninoida:

- Superfamily Raninoidea De Haan, 1839
  - Family Lyreididae Guinot, 1993
  - Family Raninidae De Haan, 1839
- Superfamily †Necrocarcinoidea Förster, 1968
  - Family †Camarocarcinidae Feldmann, Li & Schweitzer, 2007
  - Family †Cenomanocarcinidae Guinot, Vega & Van Bakel, 2008
  - Family †Moravocarcinidae Van Bakel, Fraaije, Jagt & Skupien, 2020
  - Family †Necrocarcinidae Förster, 1968
  - Family †Orithopsidae Schweitzer, Feldmann, Fam, Hessin, Hetrick, Nyborg & Ross, 2003
  - Family †Paranecrocarcinidae Fraaije, Van Bakel & Jagt & Artal, 2008
- Superfamily †Palaeocorystoidea Lőrenthey in Lőrenthey & Beurlen, 1929
  - Family †Palaeocorystidae Lőrenthey in Lőrenthey & Beurlen, 1929
