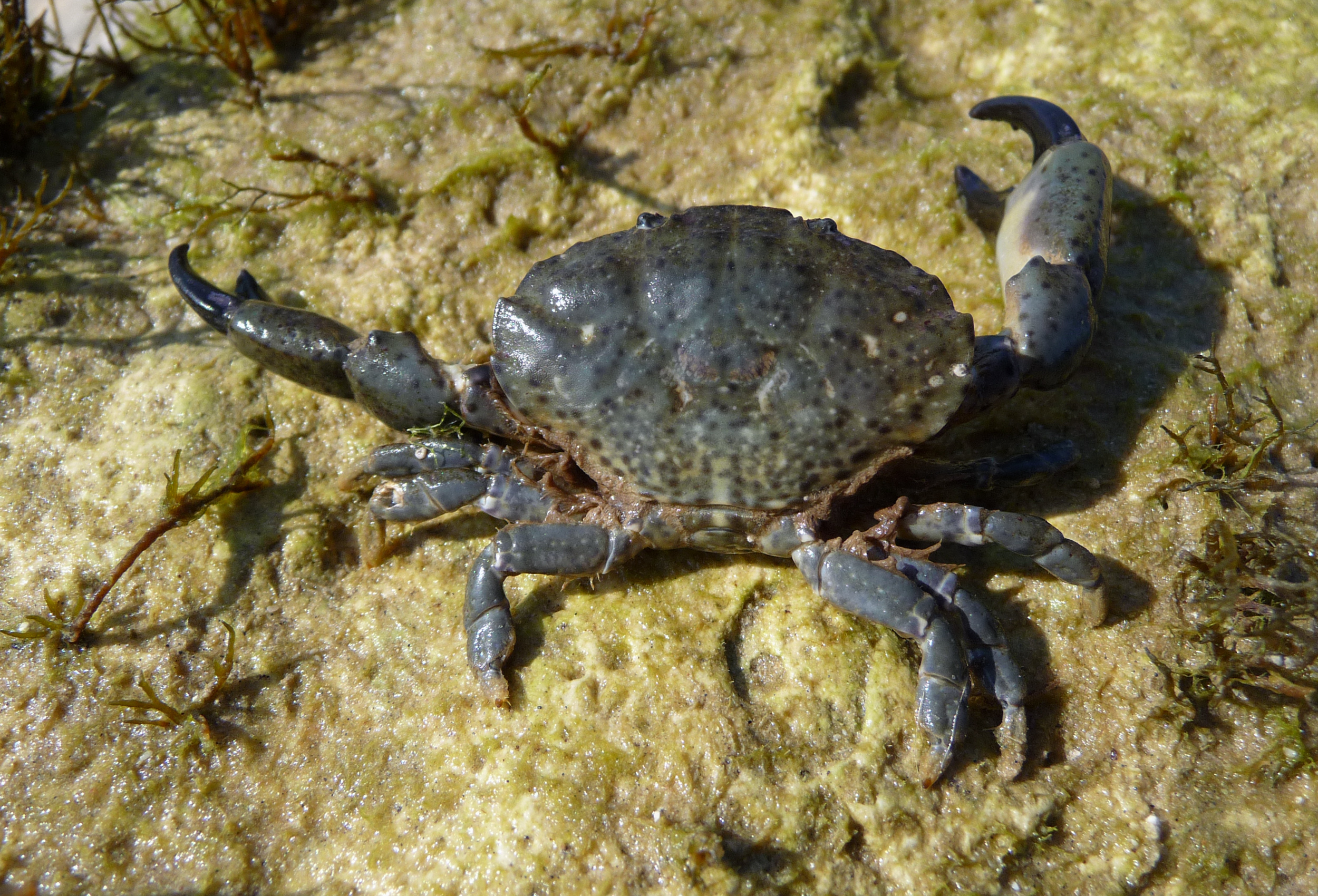
- Xantho poressa (Xanthoidea: Xanthidae)

Scientific classification
- Kingdom: Animalia
- Phylum: Arthropoda
- Clade: Pancrustacea
- Class: Malacostraca
- Order: Decapoda
- Suborder: Pleocyemata
- Infraorder: Brachyura
- Section: Eubrachyura
- Subsection: Heterotremata; Guinot, 1977

Superfamilies
- See text

= Heterotremata =

Clade of crabs

Heterotremata (from Ancient Greek ἕτερος (héteros), meaning "different", and τρῆμα (trêma), meaning "hole") is a clade of crabs, comprising those crabs in which the genital openings are on the sternum in females, but on the legs in males. It comprises 68 families in 31 superfamilies.

== Evolution ==
Heterotremata is the sister group to Thoracotremata within the clade Eubrachyura, having diverged during the Cretaceous period. Eubrachyura itself is a subset of the larger clade Brachyura, which consists of all "true crabs". A summary of the high-level internal relationships within Brachyura can be shown in the cladogram below:

- Brachyura
  - Dromiacea
  - - - Raninoida
      - Cyclodorippoida
    - Eubrachyura
      - Heterotremata
      - Thoracotremata

The internal relationships within Heterotremata are less certain, with many of the superfamilies found to be invalid. The proposed cladogram below is from analysis by Tsang et al, 2014:

- Heterotremata
  - Freshwater crabs
    - Potamoidea (Old World freshwater crabs)
      - Potamonautidae
      - - Potamidae
        - Gecarcinucidae
    - Pseudothelphusidae (New World freshwater crabs)
  - - - - Trichodactylidae (freshwater crabs)
        - Orithyiidae
      - - - Belliidae
          - Chasmocarcinidae
        - Retroplumidae
    - - - - Dorippoidea
            - Ethusidae
            - Dorippidae
          - Leucosiidae
        - - Majoidea
            - Inachidae
            - - Epialtidae (paraphyletic)
              - Majidae / Mithracidae
          - Corystidae
      - - - Euryplacidae
          - Matutidae
        - - - - Calappidae
              - - - Parthenopidae
                  - Cancridae
                - - Carpiliidae
                  - - Aethridae
                    - Pseudocarcinidae of Pseudocarcinoidea
            - - Menippe of Menippidae
              - - Polybiidae
                - Portunidae
          - - Pilumnoidea
              - Tanaochelidae
              - - Galenidae
                - Pilumnidae
            - - - - Mathildellidae
                  - - Eriphiidae
                    - - Oziidae
                      - Vultocinidae
                - Trapeziidae
              - - Goneplacidae
                - - Scalopidiidae
                  - Xanthoidea
                    - Xanthidae (paraphyletic)
                    - Panopeidae

== Superfamilies ==
- Aethroidea
- Bellioidea
- Bythograeoidea
- Calappoidea
- Cancroidea
- Carpilioidea
- Cheiragonoidea
- Corystoidea
- Dairoidea
- Dorippoidea
- Eriphioidea
- Gecarcinucoidea
- Goneplacoidea
- Hexapodoidea
- Hymenosomatoidea
- Leucosioidea
- Majoidea
- Orithyioidea
- Palicoidea
- Parthenopoidea
- Pilumnoidea
- Portunoidea
- Potamoidea
- Pseudocarcinoidea
- Pseudothelphusoidea
- Pseudozioidea
- Retroplumoidea
- Trapezioidea
- Trichodactyloidea
- Trichopeltarioidea
- Xanthoidea

However, recent studies have found the following superfamilies and families to not be monophyletic, but rather paraphyletic or polyphyletic:

- The superfamilies Calappoidea, Eriphioidea, and Goneplacoidea are polyphyletic
- The superfamily Potamoidea is paraphyletic with respect to Gecarcinucoidea, which is resolved by placing Gecarcinucidae within Potamoidea
- The Majoidea families Epialtidae, Mithracidae and Majidae are polyphyletic with respect to each other
- The Xanthoidea family Xanthidae is paraphyletic with respect to Panopeidae
