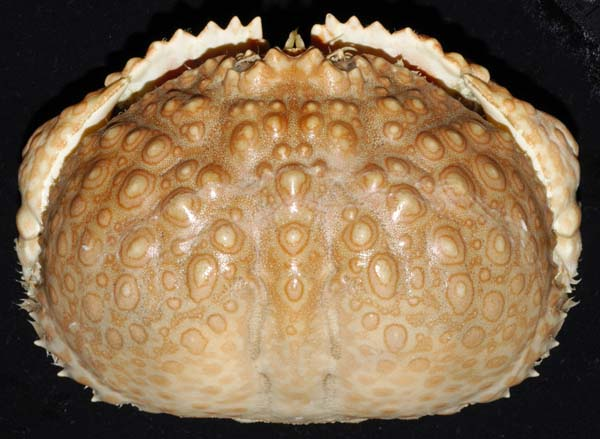
- Calappa japonica seen from above

Scientific classification
- Kingdom: Animalia
- Phylum: Arthropoda
- Clade: Pancrustacea
- Class: Malacostraca
- Order: Decapoda
- Suborder: Pleocyemata
- Infraorder: Brachyura
- Subsection: Heterotremata
- Superfamily: Calappoidea; H. Milne-Edwards, 1837

Families
- Calappidae; Matutidae

= Calappoidea =

Calappoidea Temporal range: Aptian–Recent

Superfamily of crabs

Calappoidea is a superfamily of crabs comprising the two families Calappidae and Matutidae. The earliest fossils attributable to the Calappoidea date from the Aptian.
