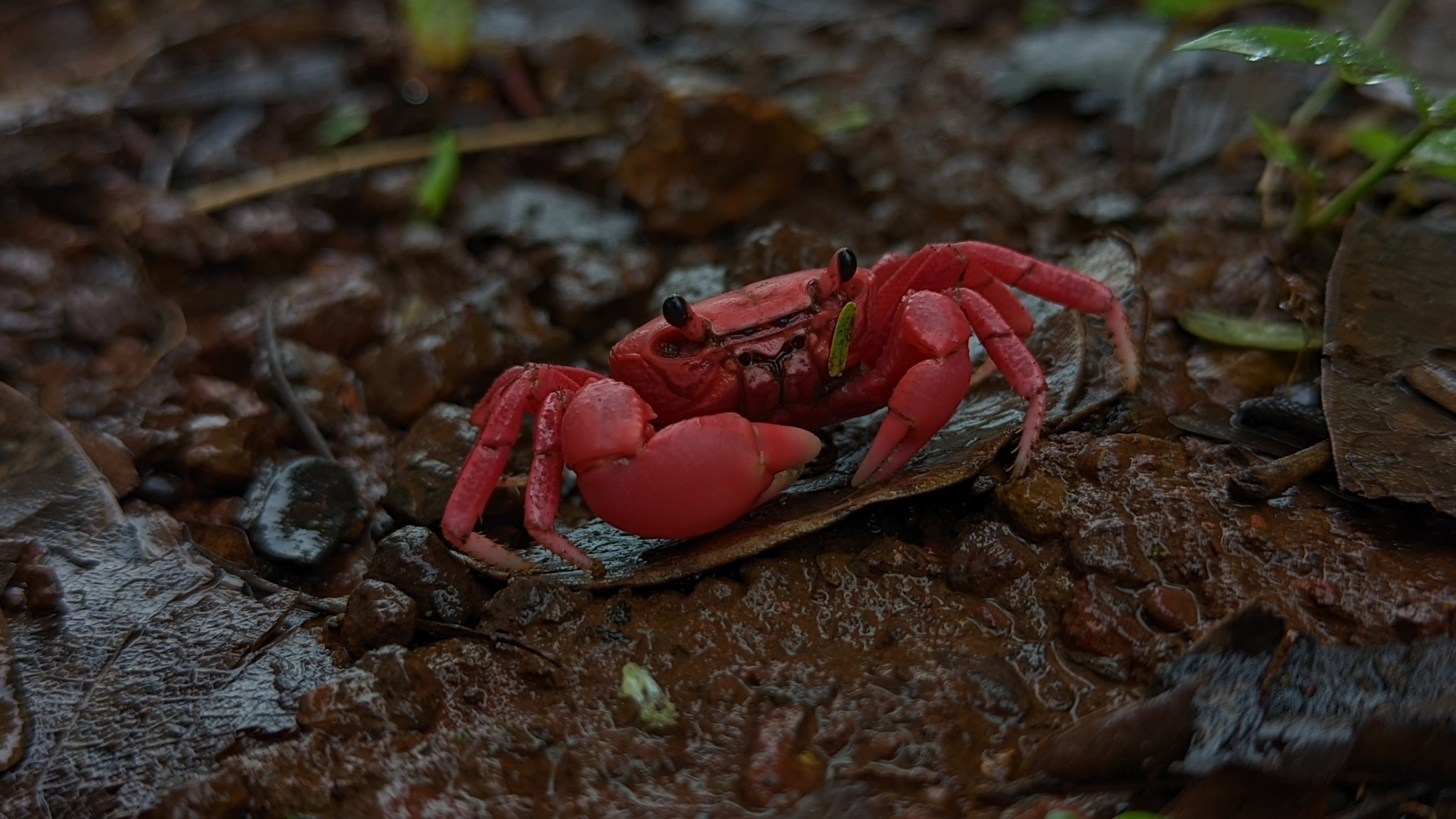
- Ghatiana botti

Scientific classification
- Kingdom: Animalia
- Phylum: Arthropoda
- Clade: Pancrustacea
- Class: Malacostraca
- Order: Decapoda
- Suborder: Pleocyemata
- Infraorder: Brachyura
- Subsection: Heterotremata
- Superfamily: Gecarcinucoidea; Rathbun, 1904

Families
- Gecarcinucidae Rathbun, 1904

= Gecarcinucoidea =

Superfamily of crabs

Gecarcinucoidea is a superfamily of freshwater crabs. Its members have been grouped into families in various ways, with some authors recognizing families such as "Deckeniidae", "Sundathelphusidae", and "Parathelphusidae", but now only the family Gecarcinucidae is currently recognized.
