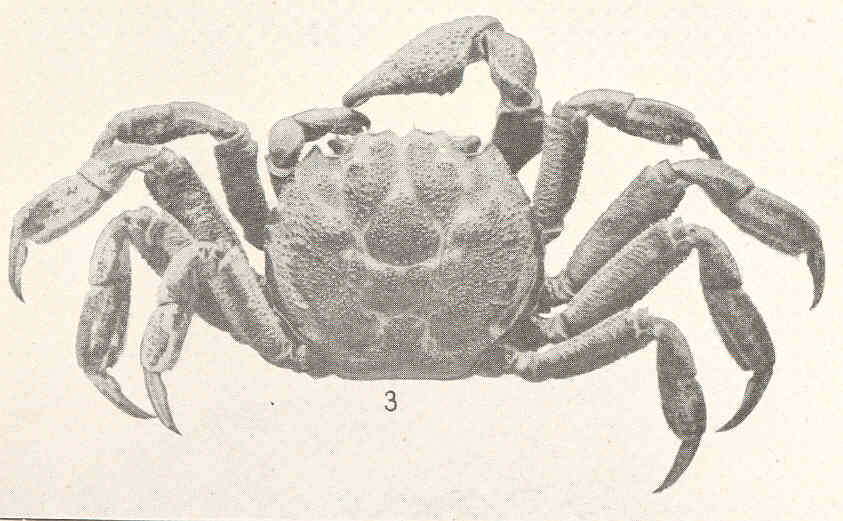
- Glyptograpsus jamaicensis

Scientific classification
- Kingdom: Animalia
- Phylum: Arthropoda
- Class: Malacostraca
- Order: Decapoda
- Suborder: Pleocyemata
- Infraorder: Brachyura
- Superfamily: Grapsoidea
- Family: Glyptograpsidae

= Glyptograpsidae =

Family of crabs

Glyptograpsidae is a family of crabs belonging to the superfamily Grapsoidea.

Genera:

- Glyptograpsus Smith, 1870
- Platychirograpsus de Man, 1896
