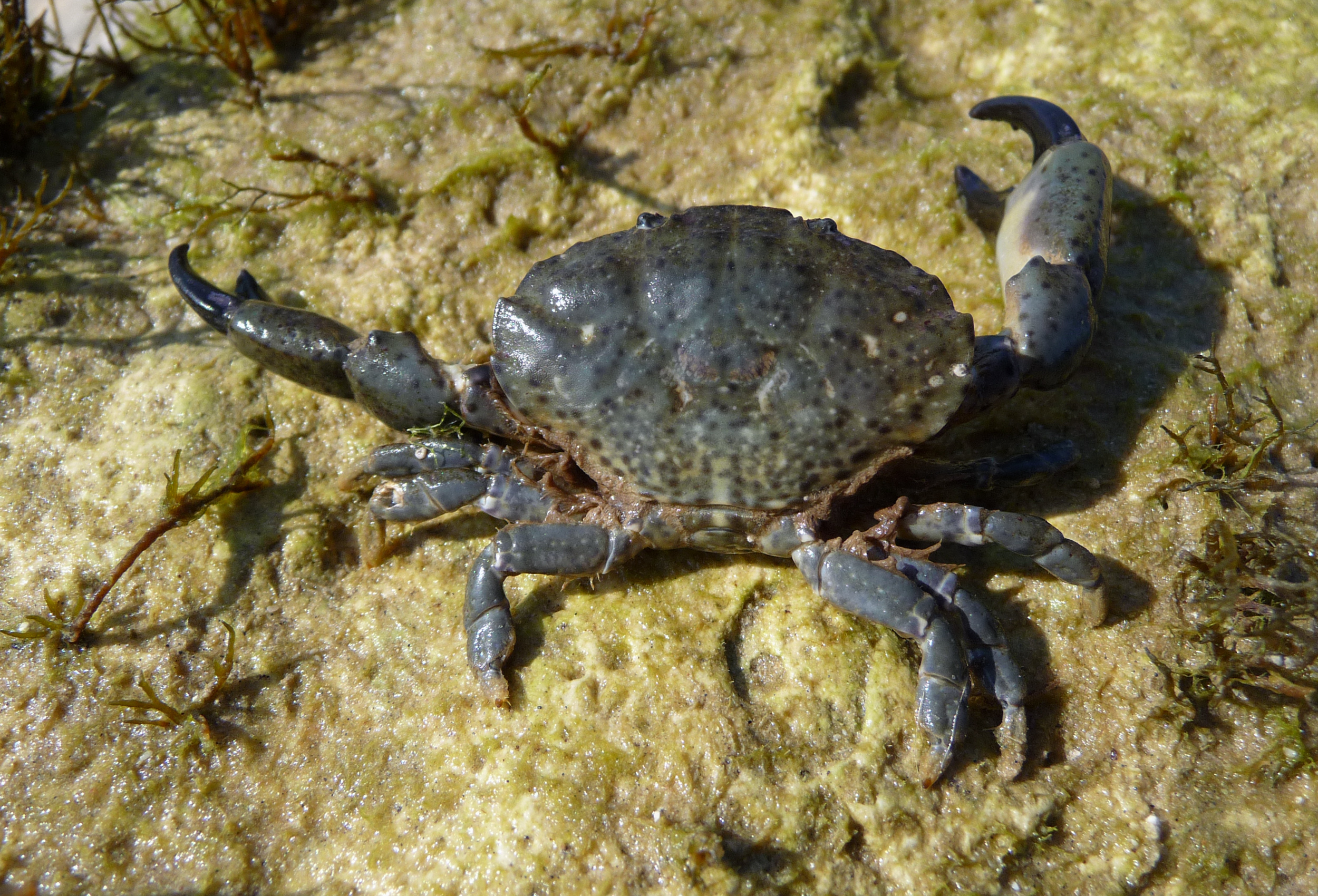
- Xantho poressa

Scientific classification
- Kingdom: Animalia
- Phylum: Arthropoda
- Class: Malacostraca
- Order: Decapoda
- Suborder: Pleocyemata
- Infraorder: Brachyura
- Subsection: Heterotremata
- Superfamily: Xanthoidea; MacLeay, 1838

Families
- See text

= Xanthoidea =

Superfamily of crabs

Xanthoidea is a superfamily of crabs, comprising seven families. Formerly, a number of other families were included in Xanthoidea, but many of these have since been removed to other superfamilies. These include Carpilioidea, Eriphioidea, Hexapodoidea, Pilumnoidea and Trapezioidea. Even in this reduced state, Xanthoidea remains one of the most species-rich superfamilies of crabs.

== Families ==
The World Register of Marine Species lists the following families:

- Antrocarcinidae Ng & Chia, 1994
- Garthiellidae Mendoza & Manuel-Santos, 2012
- Linnaeoxanthidae Števčić, 2005
- Nanocassiopidae Števčić, 2013
- Panopeidae Ortmann, 1893
- Pseudorhombilidae Alcock, 1900
- Xanthidae MacLeay, 1838
