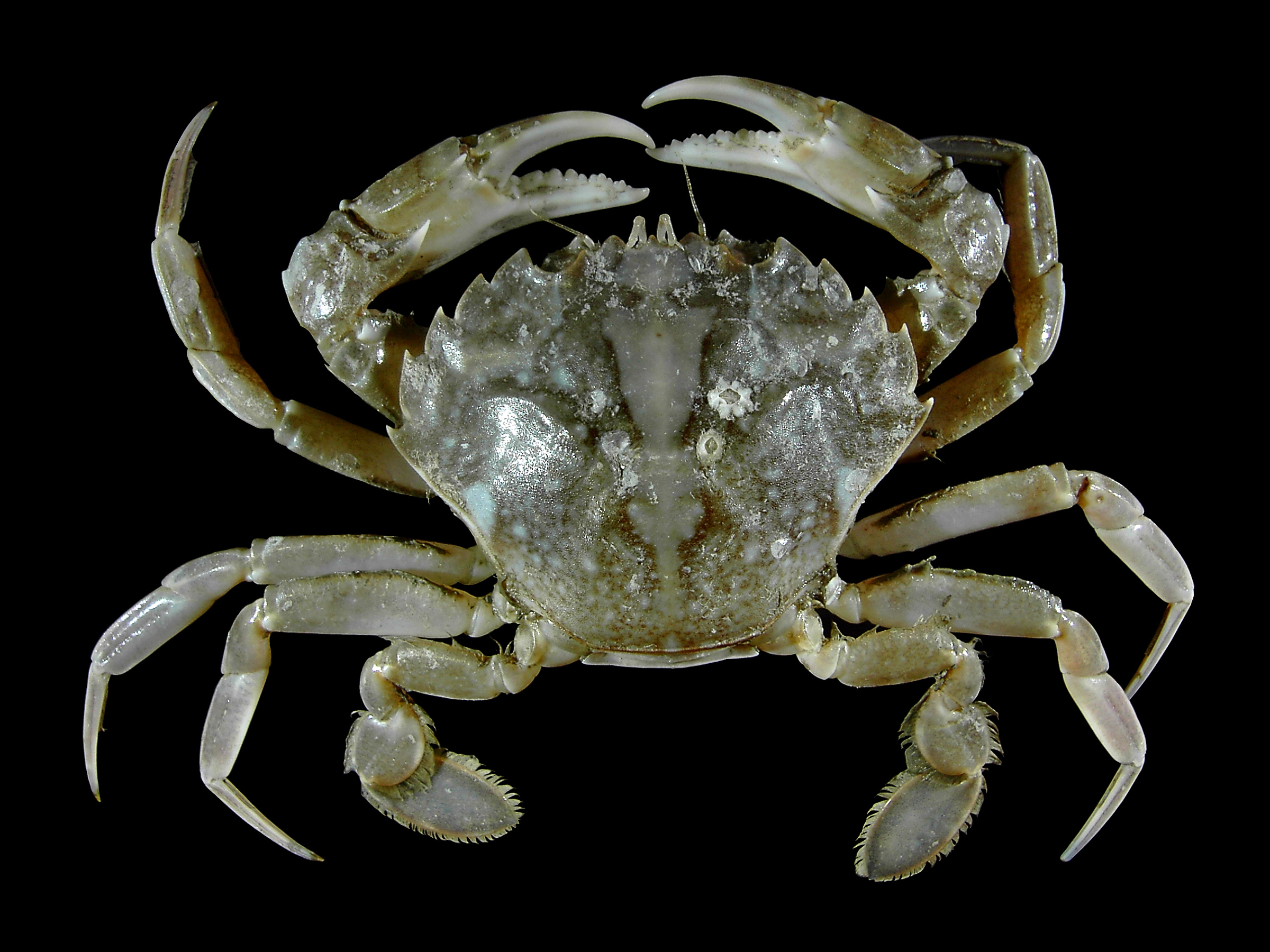
- Image of Liocarcinus vernalis

Scientific classification
- Kingdom: Animalia
- Phylum: Arthropoda
- Clade: Pancrustacea
- Class: Malacostraca
- Order: Decapoda
- Suborder: Pleocyemata
- Infraorder: Brachyura
- Family: Polybiidae
- Genus: Polybius
- Species: P. vernalis

Binomial name
- Polybius vernalis (Risso, 1816)

Synonyms
- Macropipus vernalis (Risso, 1827); Polybius vernalis (Risso, 1827); Portunus barbarus Lucas, 1846; Portunus dubius Rathke, 1837; Portunus valentieni Cocco, 1833; Portunus vernalis Risso, 1816

= Polybius vernalis =

Species of crab

Polybius vernalis, the grey swimming crab, is a small, shallow-water crab in the family Portunidae. P. vernalis was believed to be a strictly Mediterranean species, but newer evidence implies its presence in the North Sea is not that recent.
