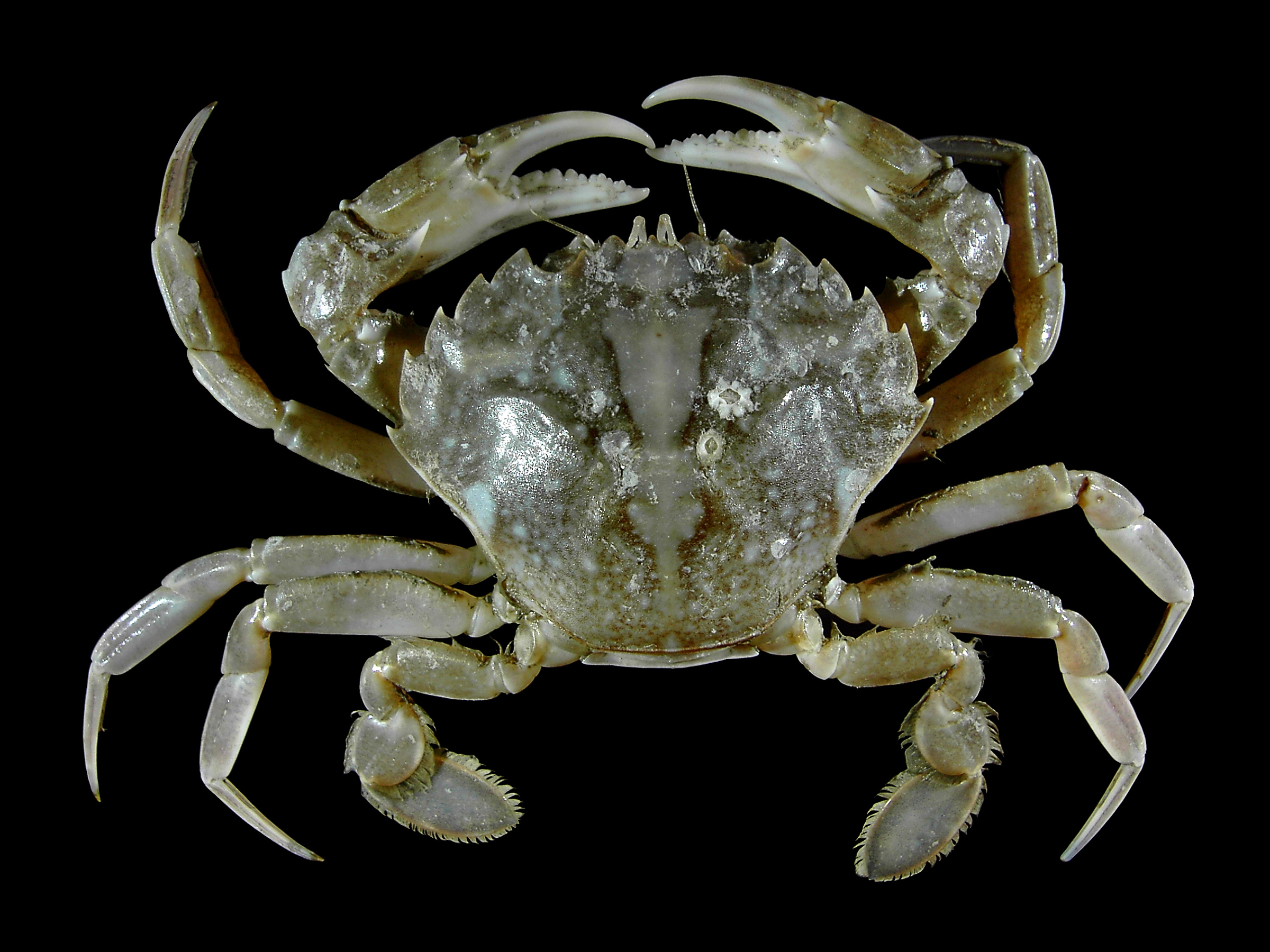
- Liocarcinus vernalis

Scientific classification
- Kingdom: Animalia
- Phylum: Arthropoda
- Clade: Pancrustacea
- Class: Malacostraca
- Order: Decapoda
- Suborder: Pleocyemata
- Infraorder: Brachyura
- Section: Eubrachyura de Saint Laurent, 1980

Subsections
- Heterotremata; Thoracotremata; †Tepexicarcinidae (basal); †Cretapsaridae (incertae sedis)

= Eubrachyura =

Eubrachyura Temporal range: Cretaceous–recent

Group of crabs

Eubrachyura is a group of decapod crustaceans (ranked as a "section") comprising the more derived crabs. It is divided into two subsections, based on the position of the genital openings in the two sexes. In the Heterotremata, the openings are on the legs in the males, but on the sternum in females, while in the Thoracotremata, the openings are on the sternum in both sexes. This contrasts with the situation in other decapods, in which the genital openings are always on the legs. Heterotremata is the larger of the two groups, containing the species-rich superfamilies Xanthoidea and Pilumnoidea and all the freshwater crabs (Gecarcinucoidea, Potamoidea). The eubrachyura is well known for actively and constantly building its own burrows. The fossil record of the Eubrachyura extends back to the Cretaceous; the supposed Bathonian (Middle Jurassic) representative of the group, Hebertides jurassica, ultimately turned out to be Cenozoic in age.

Here is a cladogram showing Eubrachyura's placement within Brachyura, as well as the two subgroups Heterotremata and Thoracotremata:

- Brachyura
  - Dromiacea
  - - - Raninoida
      - Cyclodorippoida
    - Eubrachyura
      - Heterotremata
      - Thoracotremata
