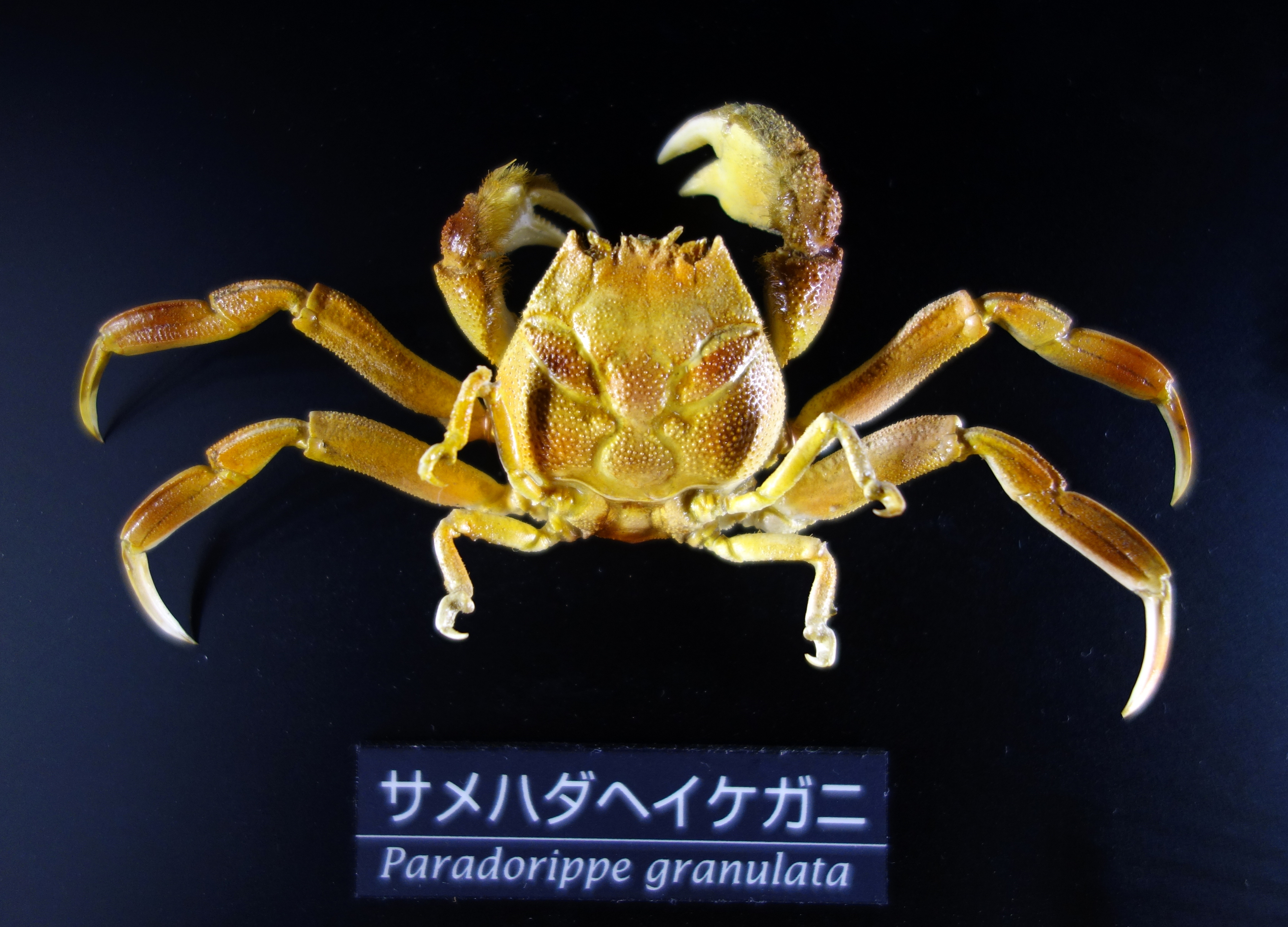
- Paradorippe granulata

Scientific classification
- Kingdom: Animalia
- Phylum: Arthropoda
- Clade: Pancrustacea
- Class: Malacostraca
- Order: Decapoda
- Suborder: Pleocyemata
- Infraorder: Brachyura
- Superfamily: Dorippoidea
- Family: Dorippidae; Macleay, 1838

= Dorippidae =

Family of crabs

Dorippidae is a small family of crabs, commonly found in the shallow sand and mud substrate in coastal waters. Though common, they don't contribute any economic value and are often discarded as bycatch.

Dorippidae contains the following genera (extinct genera marked "†"):

- † Archaeocypoda Secretan, 1975
- † Bartethusa Quayle & Collins, 1981
- Dorippe Weber, 1795
- Dorippoides Serène & Romimohtarto, 1969
- † Eodorippe Glaessner, 1980
- Heikeopsis Ng, Guinot & Davie, 2008
- † Hillius Bishop, 1983b
- Medorippe Manning & Holthuis, 1981
- Neodorippe Serène & Romimohtarto, 1969
- Nobilum Serène & Romimohtarto, 1969
- Paradorippe Serène & Romimohtarto, 1969
- Philippidorippe H. Chen, 1986
- Phyllodorippe Manning & Holthuis, 1981
- † Sodakus Bishop, 1978
- † Telamonocarcinus Larghi, 2004
- † Tepexicarcinus Feldmann, Vega, Applegate & Bishop, 1998
- † Titanodorippe Blow & Manning, 1996

== Legend ==
In Chinese folklore, after Guan Yu was killed by Lü Meng during the Three Kingdoms period, he transformed into the Guan Gong Crab, also called the Ghost Face Crab or Human Face Crab, distinguished by its red shell resembling a human face.
