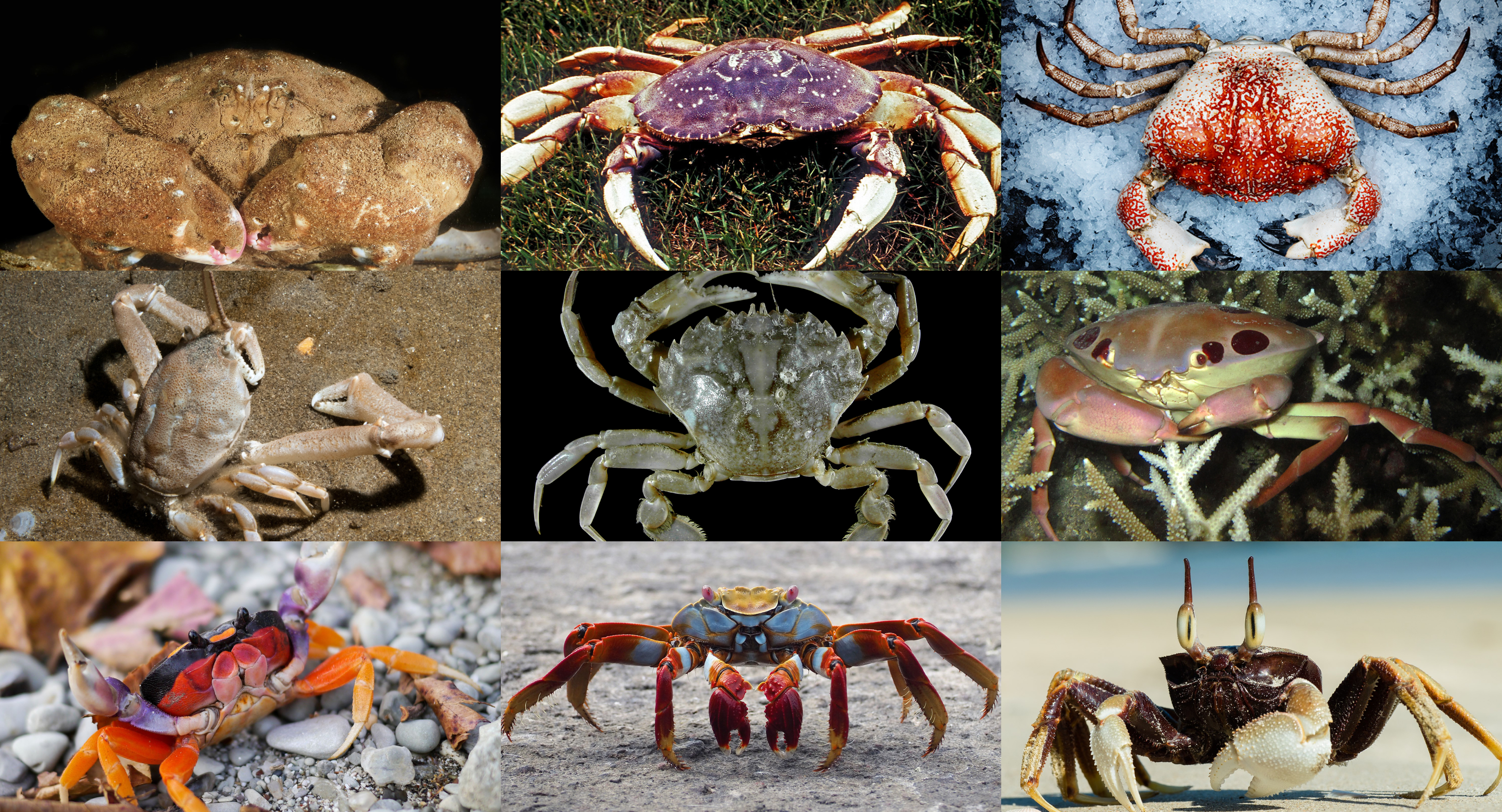
- Top row, left to right: Dromia personata (Dromiidae), Dungeness crab (Cancridae), Tasmanian giant crab (Menippidae); Middle row: Corystes cassivelaunus (Corystidae), Liocarcinus vernalis (Portunidae), Carpilius maculatus (Carpiliidae); Bottom row: Gecarcinus quadratus (Gecarcinidae), Grapsus grapsus (Grapsidae), Ocypode ceratophthalmus (Ocypodidae).

Scientific classification
- Kingdom: Animalia
- Phylum: Arthropoda
- Clade: Pancrustacea
- Class: Malacostraca
- Order: Decapoda
- Suborder: Pleocyemata
- Clade: Reptantia
- Infraorder: Brachyura; Latreille, 1802

Sections and subsections
- Dromiacea; Raninoida; Cyclodorippoida; Eubrachyura; Heterotremata; Thoracotremata

= Brachyura =

Brachyura Temporal range: Early Jurassic–Present

Infraorder of crustaceans

Brachyura is an infraorder of decapod crustaceans comprising the true crabs. They typically have a very short projecting tail-like abdomen, usually hidden entirely under the thorax. Their exoskeleton is often thickened and hard. They generally have five pairs of legs, and the frontmost pair end in chelae, which function as pincers. They are present in all the world's oceans, in freshwater, and on land, often hiding themselves in small crevices or burrowing into sediment. True crabs are omnivores, feeding on a variety of food, including a significant proportion of algae, as well as detritus and other invertebrates. True crabs are widely consumed by humans as food, with over 1.5 million tonnes caught annually.

True crabs first appeared in the fossil record during the Jurassic period, around 200 million years ago, achieving great diversity by the Cretaceous period; around 7,000 living species in 96 families are known. The Brachyura are the largest of the crab decapod groups with carcinised body forms. Smaller groups include the porcelain crabs, king crabs, and hairy stone crabs which have independently evolved similar forms and lifestyles.

== Biology ==
=== Description ===
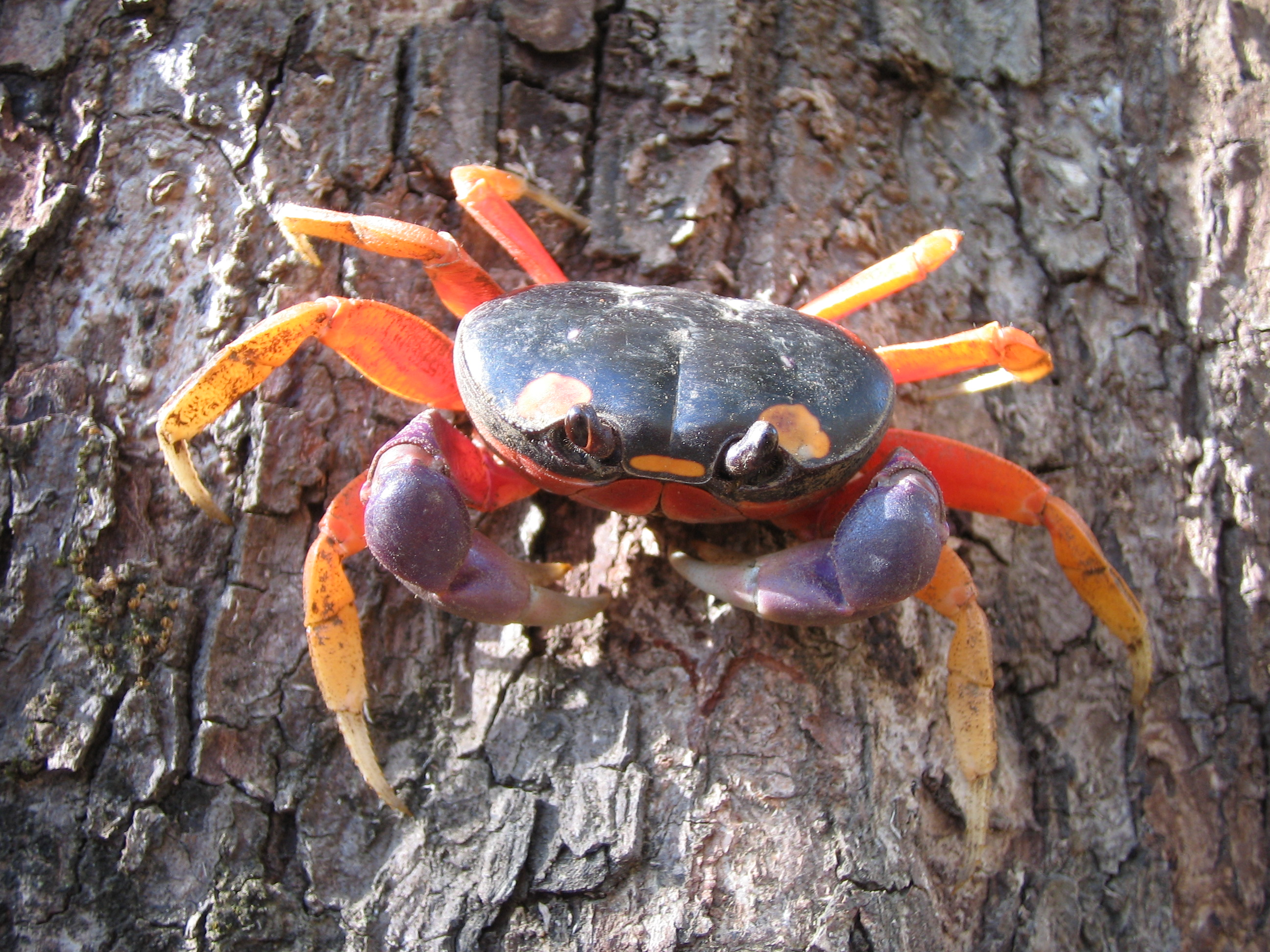
Gecarcinus quadratus, a land crab from Central America

Brachyuran crabs are generally covered with a thick exoskeleton, composed primarily of highly mineralized chitin. Behind their pair of chelae (claws) are six walking legs and then two swimming legs. The crab breathes through gills on its underside; gills must be at least moist to work.

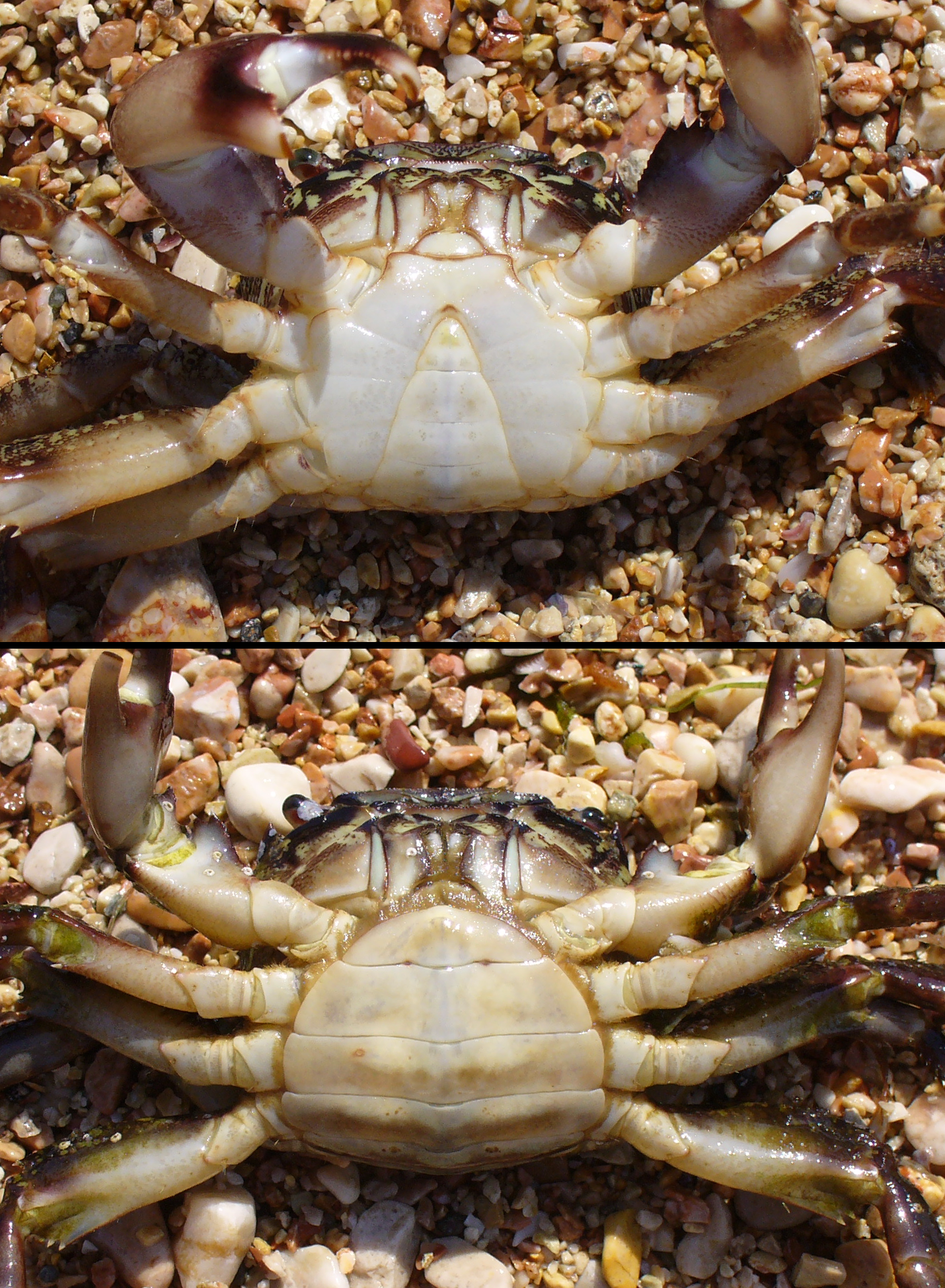
The underside of a male (top) and a female (bottom) individual of Pachygrapsus marmoratus, showing the difference in shape of the abdomen

True crabs vary in size from the pea crab, a few millimeters wide, to the Japanese spider crab, with a leg span up to 4 m (13 ft). Several other groups of crustaceans with similar appearances – such as king crabs and porcelain crabs have convergently evolved similar features to true crabs, making them good examples of carcinisation.

Brachyuran crabs are often markedly sexually dimorphic. Males of many species have larger claws, a tendency that is particularly pronounced in the fiddler crabs of the genus Uca (Ocypodidae). In fiddler crabs, males have one greatly enlarged claw used for communication, particularly for attracting a mate. Another conspicuous difference is the form of the pleon (abdomen); in most male crabs, this is narrow and triangular in form, while females have a broader, rounded abdomen. This is because female crabs brood fertilised eggs on their pleopods.

=== Life cycle ===
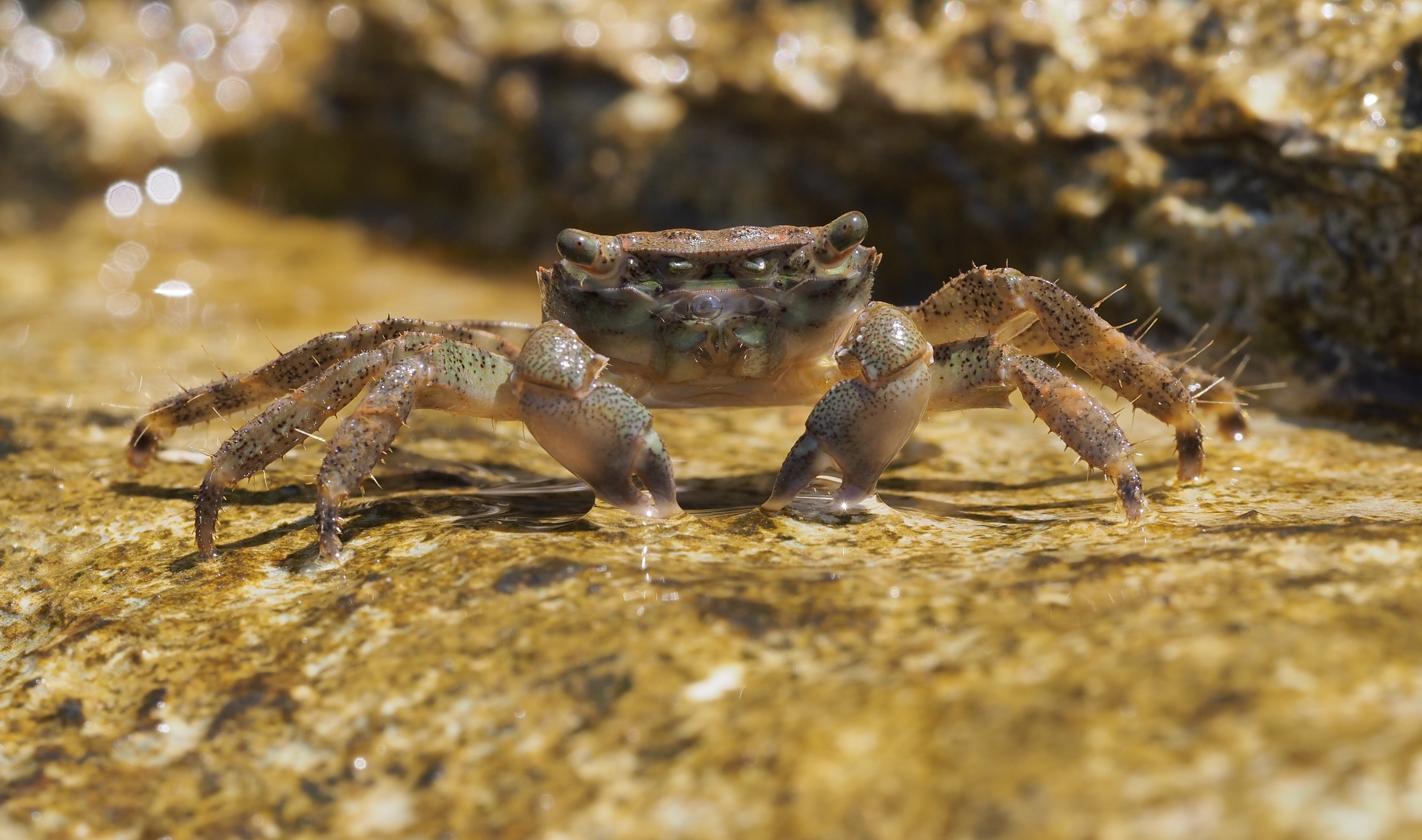
Crab (Pachygrapsus marmoratus) on Istrian coast, Adriatic Sea

True crabs attract a mate through chemical (pheromones), visual, acoustic, or vibratory means. Pheromones are used by most fully aquatic species, while terrestrial and semiterrestrial crabs often use visual signals, such as fiddler crab males waving their large claws to attract females. The vast number of brachyuran crabs have internal fertilisation and mate belly-to-belly. For many aquatic species, mating takes place just after the female has moulted and is still soft. Females can store the sperm for a long time before using it to fertilise their eggs. When fertilisation has taken place, the eggs are released onto the female's abdomen, below the tail flap, secured with a sticky material. In this location, they are protected during embryonic development. Females carrying eggs are called "berried" since the eggs resemble round berries.

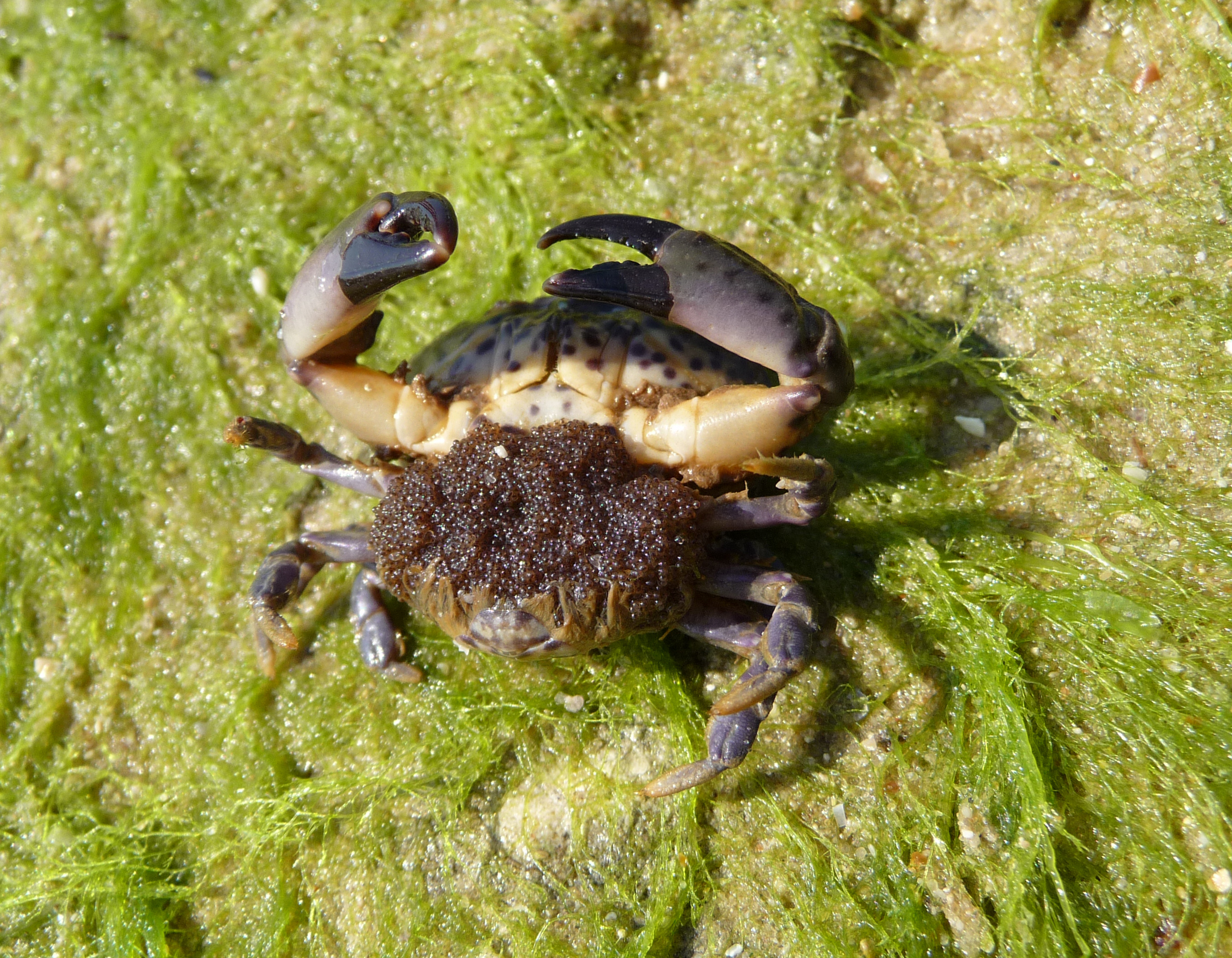
Female crab Xantho poressa at spawning time in the Black Sea, carrying eggs under her abdomen

When development is complete, the female releases the newly hatched larvae into the water, where they are part of the plankton. The release is often timed with the tidal and light/dark diurnal cycle. The free-swimming tiny zoea larvae can float and take advantage of water currents. They have a spine, which probably reduces the rate of predation by larger animals. The zoea of most species must find food, but some crabs provide enough yolk in the eggs that the larval stages can continue to live off the yolk.

A Grapsus tenuicrustatus climbing up a rock in Hawaii

Each species has a particular number of zoeal stages, separated by moults, before they change into a megalopa stage, which resembles an adult crab, except for having the abdomen (tail) sticking out behind. After one more moult, the crab is a juvenile, living on the bottom rather than floating in the water. This last moult, from megalopa to juvenile, is critical, and it must take place in a habitat that is suitable for the juvenile to survive.

Most terrestrial crabs must migrate down to the ocean to release their larvae; in some cases, this entails very extensive migrations. After living for a short time as larvae in the ocean, the juveniles must do this migration in reverse. In many tropical areas with land crabs, these migrations often result in considerable roadkill of migrating crabs.

Once crabs have become juveniles, they still have to keep moulting many more times to become adults. They are covered with a hard shell, which would otherwise prevent growth. The moult cycle is coordinated by hormones. When preparing for moult, the old shell is softened and partly eroded away, while the rudimentary beginnings of a new shell form under it. At the time of moulting, the crab takes in a lot of water to expand and crack open the old shell at a line of weakness along the back edge of the carapace. The crab must then extract all of itself – including its legs, mouthparts, eyestalks, and even the lining of the front and back of the digestive tract – from the old shell. This is a difficult process that takes many hours, and if a crab gets stuck, it will die. After freeing itself from the old shell (now called an exuvia), the crab is extremely soft and hides until its new shell has hardened. While the new shell is still soft, the crab can expand it to make room for future growth.

=== Behaviour ===
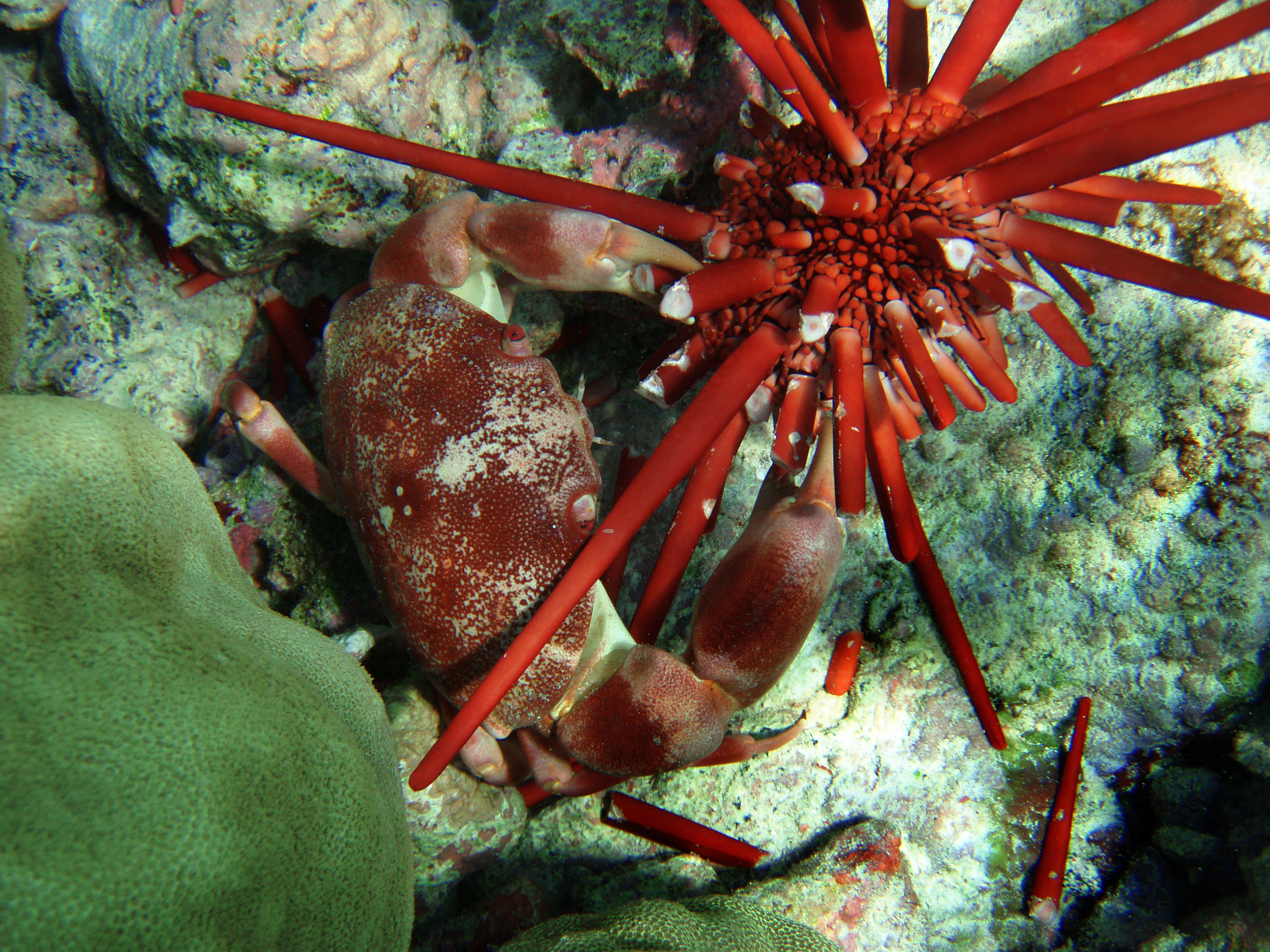
Carpilius convexus consuming Heterocentrotus trigonarius in Hawaii

True crabs typically walk sideways (hence the term crabwise), because of the articulation of the legs which makes a sidelong gait more efficient. Some crabs walk forward or backward, including raninids, Libinia emarginata and Mictyris platycheles. Some crabs, like the Portunidae and Matutidae, are also capable of swimming, the Portunidae especially so as their last pair of walking legs are flattened into swimming paddles.

Brachyuran crabs are mostly active animals with complex behaviour patterns such as communicating by drumming or waving their pincers. Crabs tend to be aggressive toward one another, and males often fight to gain access to females. On rocky seashores, where nearly all caves and crevices are occupied, crabs may also fight over hiding holes. Fiddler crabs (genus Uca) dig burrows in sand or mud, which they use for resting, hiding, and mating, and to defend against intruders.

True crabs are omnivores, feeding primarily on algae, and taking any other food, including molluscs, worms, other crustaceans, fungi, bacteria, and detritus, depending on their availability and the crab species. For many crabs, a mixed diet of plant and animal matter results in the fastest growth and greatest fitness. Some species are more specialised in their diets, based in plankton, clams or fish. Some crabs, such as members of Pinnotheridae, live on or inside animals such as bivalves, either being commensal (benign) or parasitic on their host.

True crabs have evolved a variety of mechanisms for retaining eggs within their telson, including a "push button" mechanism and socket-like structures.

Brachyurans are durophagous, characterised by the high closing force they can exert with their claws. The Florida stone crab generates the highest muscle force per unit area reported for animals, at 2000 kiloNewtons/m^{2}, while other animals generate 100–300 kN/m^{2}. Crabs of the family Cancridae, Romaleon antennarium, R. branneri, Metacarcinus gracilis, M. magister, Glebocarcinus oregonensis, and Cancer productus, generate closing forces that exceed the force/weight ratio threshold determined for most animals by allometric equations, of 20 body masses^{1/3}; this exceptional muscle strength could be due to greater resting sarcomere length than those of other animals at 10–18 micrometres, compared to 2.7 micrometres in mammals.

== Evolution ==
The infraorder Brachyura contains approximately 7,000 species in 98 families, as many as the remainder of the Decapoda. They are found in all of the world's oceans, as well as in fresh water and on land, particularly in tropical regions. About 850 species are freshwater crabs.

The evolution of crabs is characterized by an increasingly robust body, and a reduction in the abdomen. Although many other groups have undergone similar processes, carcinisation is most advanced in crabs. The telson is no longer functional in crabs, and the uropods are absent, having probably evolved into small devices for holding the reduced abdomen tight against the sternum.

In most decapods, the gonopores (sexual openings) are found on the legs. Since crabs use their first two pairs of pleopods (abdominal appendages) for sperm transfer, this arrangement has changed. As the male abdomen evolved into a slimmer shape, the gonopores have moved toward the midline, away from the legs, and onto the sternum. A similar change occurred, independently, with the female gonopores. The movement of the female gonopore to the sternum defines the clade Eubrachyura, and the later change in the position of the male gonopore defines the Thoracotremata. It is still a subject of debate whether a monophyletic group is formed by those crabs where the female, but not male, gonopores are situated on the sternum.

=== Fossil history ===
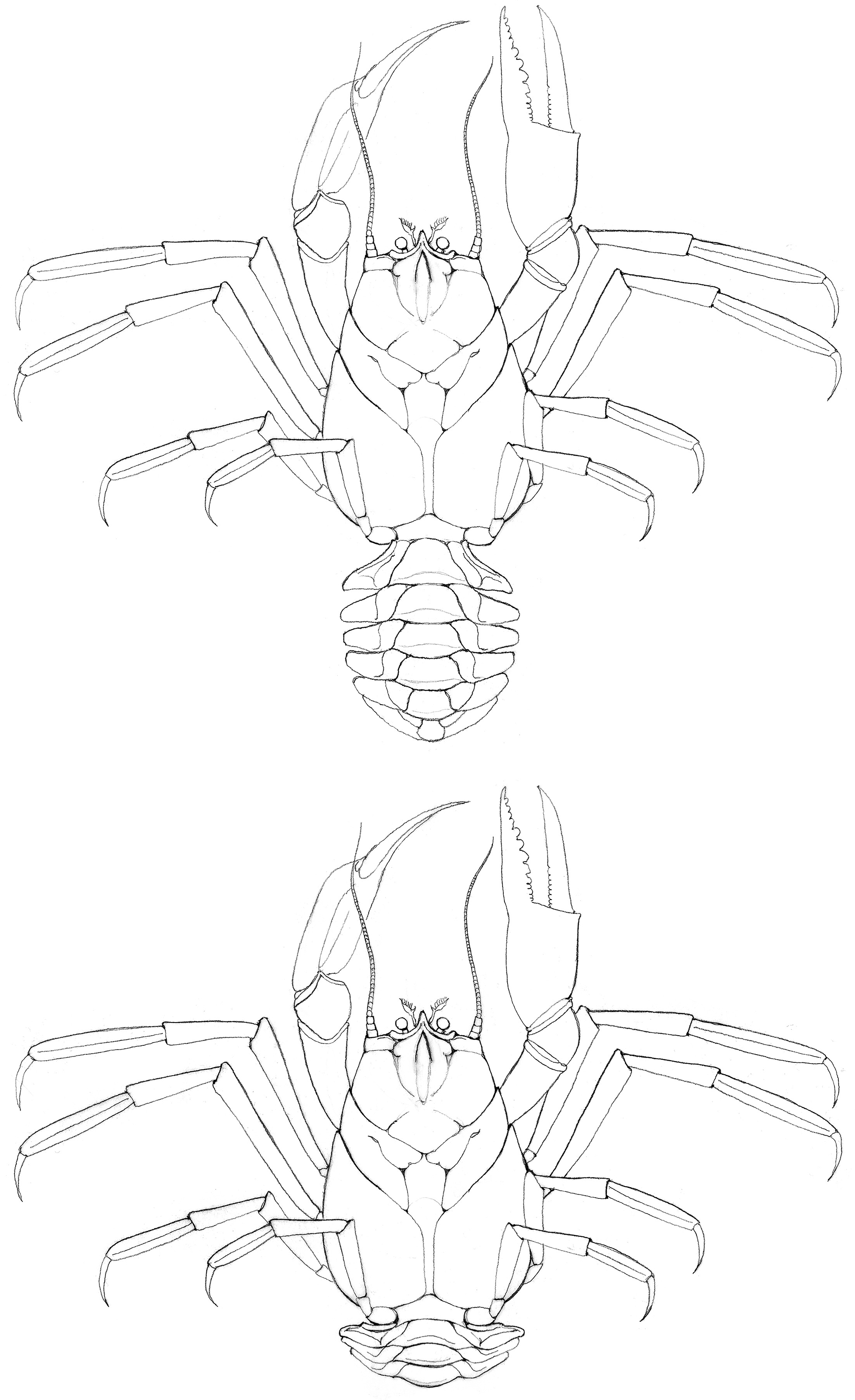
Reconstruction of Eocarcinus, the earliest known crab

The earliest unambiguous brachyuran fossils date from the Early Jurassic, with the oldest being Eocarcinus from the early Pliensbachian of Britain, which likely represents a stem-group lineage, as it lacks several key morphological features that define modern crabs. Most Jurassic crabs are only known from dorsal (top half of the body) carapaces, making it difficult to determine their relationships. Crabs radiated in the Late Jurassic, corresponding with an increase in reef habitats, though they would decline at the end of the Jurassic as the result of the decline of reef ecosystems. Crabs increased in diversity through the Cretaceous and represented the dominant group of decapods by the end of the period.

=== Taxonomic history ===
The group was originally described and named by the French zoologist Pierre André Latreille in 1802, in his contribution to Georges-Louis Leclerc, Comte de Buffon's multi-volume work Histoire Naturelle, Générale et Particulière des Crustacés et des Insectes. The name Brachyura comes from Ancient Greek βραχύς (brakhús), meaning "short", and οὐρά (ourá), meaning "tail".

The Brachura are a complex and not well-understood group, and its taxonomy has been revised, for example by Ling and colleagues in 2014. They found that numerous groups formerly treated as superfamilies are not clades (they are instead paraphyletic or polyphyletic), requiring further phylogenetic analysis.

=== External phylogeny ===
The infraorder Brachyura belongs to the group Reptantia, which consists of the walking/crawling decapods (lobsters and crabs). Brachyura is the sister clade to the infraorder Anomura, which contains the hermit crabs and relatives. The cladogram below shows Brachyura's placement within the larger order Decapoda, from analysis by Wolfe et al., 2019.

- Decapoda
  - - Dendrobranchiata (prawns)
  - Pleocyemata
    - - Stenopodidea (boxer shrimp)
      - - Procarididea
        - Caridea ("true" shrimp)
    - Reptantia (crawling / walking decapods)
      - - Achelata (spiny lobsters and slipper lobsters)
        - - Polychelida (benthic crustaceans)
          - Glypheidea (glypheoid lobsters)
          - Astacidea (lobsters and crayfish)
      - - Axiidea (mud shrimp, ghost shrimp, and burrowing shrimp)
        - - Gebiidea (mud lobsters and mud shrimp)
          - - Anomura (hermit crabs and allies)
            - Brachyura ("true" crabs)

=== Internal phylogeny ===
Brachyura is separated into several sections, with the basal Dromiacea diverging the earliest in the evolutionary history, around the Late Triassic or Early Jurassic. The group consisting of Raninoida and Cyclodorippoida split off next, during the Jurassic period. The remaining clade Eubrachyura then divided during the Cretaceous period into Heterotremata and Thoracotremata. A summary of the high-level internal relationships within Brachyura can be shown in the cladogram below:

- Brachyura
  - Dromiacea
  - - - Raninoida
      - Cyclodorippoida
    - Eubrachyura
      - Heterotremata
      - Thoracotremata

There is a no consensus on the relationships of the subsequent superfamilies and families. The proposed cladogram below is from analysis by Tsang et al, 2014:

- Brachyura
  - Dromiacea
    - Dromioidea
      - Dromiidae (may be paraphyletic)
      - Dynomenidae
    - Homoloidea
      - Homolidae (paraphyletic)
      - Latreilliidae
  - - - Raninoida
        Raninidae
      - Cyclodorippoida
        - Cyclodorippidae
        - Cymonomidae
    - Eubrachyura
      - Heterotremata
        - Freshwater crabs
          - Potamoidea (Old World freshwater crabs)
            - Potamonautidae
            - - Potamidae
              - Gecarcinucidae
          - Pseudothelphusoidea (New World freshwater crabs)
            Pseudothelphusidae
        - - - - Trichodactylidae (freshwater crabs)
              - Orithyiidae
            - - - Belliidae
                - Chasmocarcinidae
              - Retroplumidae
          - - - - Dorippoidea
                  - Ethusidae
                  - Dorippidae
                - Leucosiidae
              - - Majoidea
                  - Inachidae
                  - - Epialtidae (paraphyletic)
                    - Majidae / Mithracidae
                - Corystidae
            - - - Euryplacidae
                - Matutidae
              - - - - Calappidae
                    - - - Parthenopidae
                        - Cancridae
                      - - Carpiliidae
                        - - Aethridae
                          - Pseudocarcinus of Menippidae
                  - - Menippe of Menippidae
                    - - Polybiidae
                      - Portunidae
                - - Pilumnoidea
                    - Tanaochelidae
                    - - Galenidae
                      - Pilumnidae
                  - - - - Mathildellidae
                        - - Eriphiidae
                          - - Oziidae
                            - Vultocinidae
                      - Trapeziidae
                    - - Goneplacidae
                      - - Scalopidiidae
                        - Xanthoidea
                          - Xanthidae (paraphyletic)
                          - Panopeidae
      - Thoracotremata
        - - Pinnotheridae
          - Dotillidae
        - - Percnidae
          - - - Xenograpsidae
              - Cryptochiridae
            - - - Ocypodidae
                - - Glyptograpsidae
                  - Grapsidae
              - - - - Plagusiidae
                    - Gecarcinidae
                  - Sesarmidae
                - - Mictyridae
                  - - Varunidae
                    - Macrophthalmidae

=== Families ===
Numbers of extant and extinct (†) species are given in brackets. The superfamily Eocarcinoidea, containing Eocarcinus and Platykotta, was formerly thought to contain the oldest crabs; it is now considered part of the Anomura.

Sections of the group

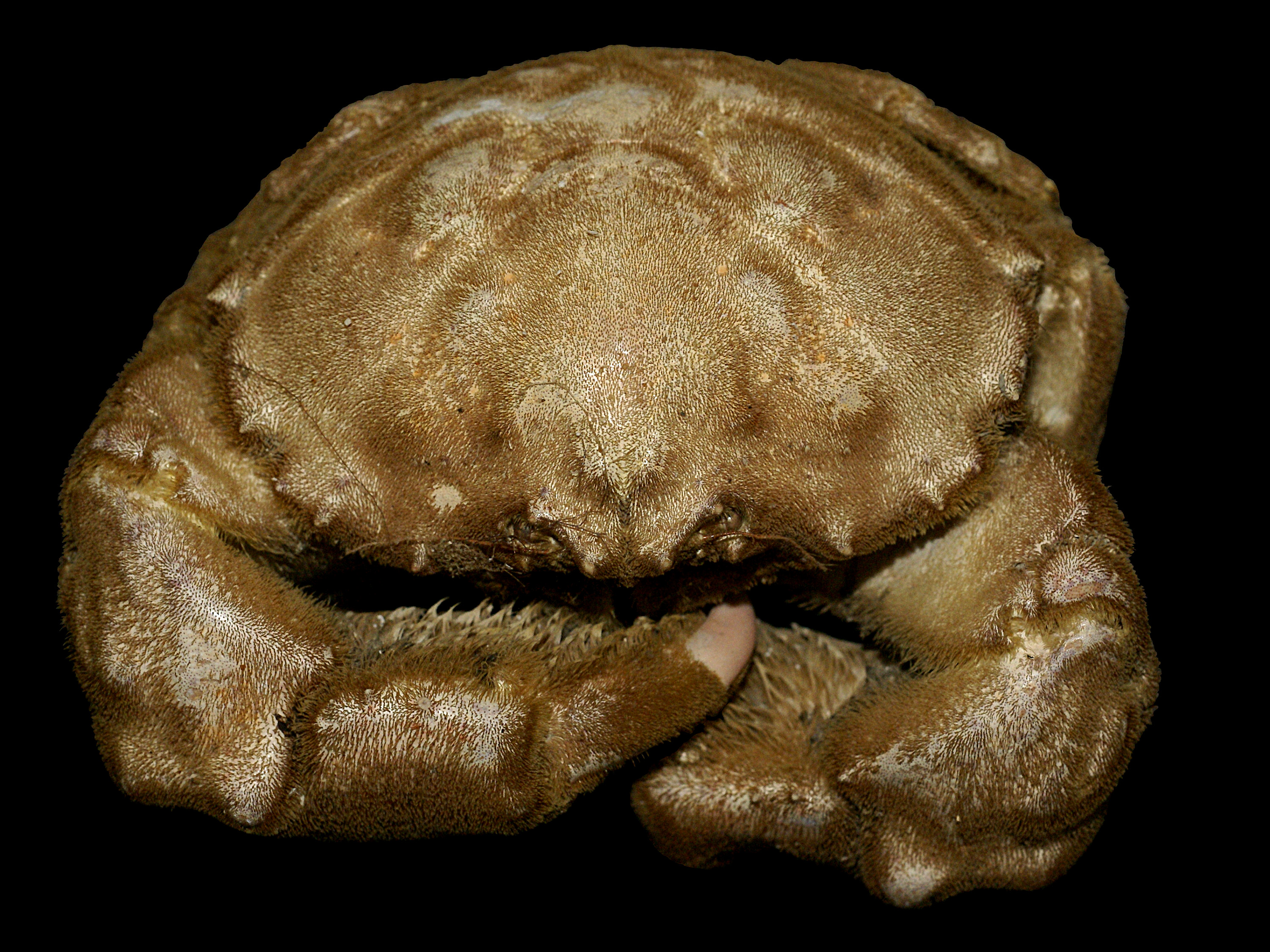
Dromia personata (Dromiacea)

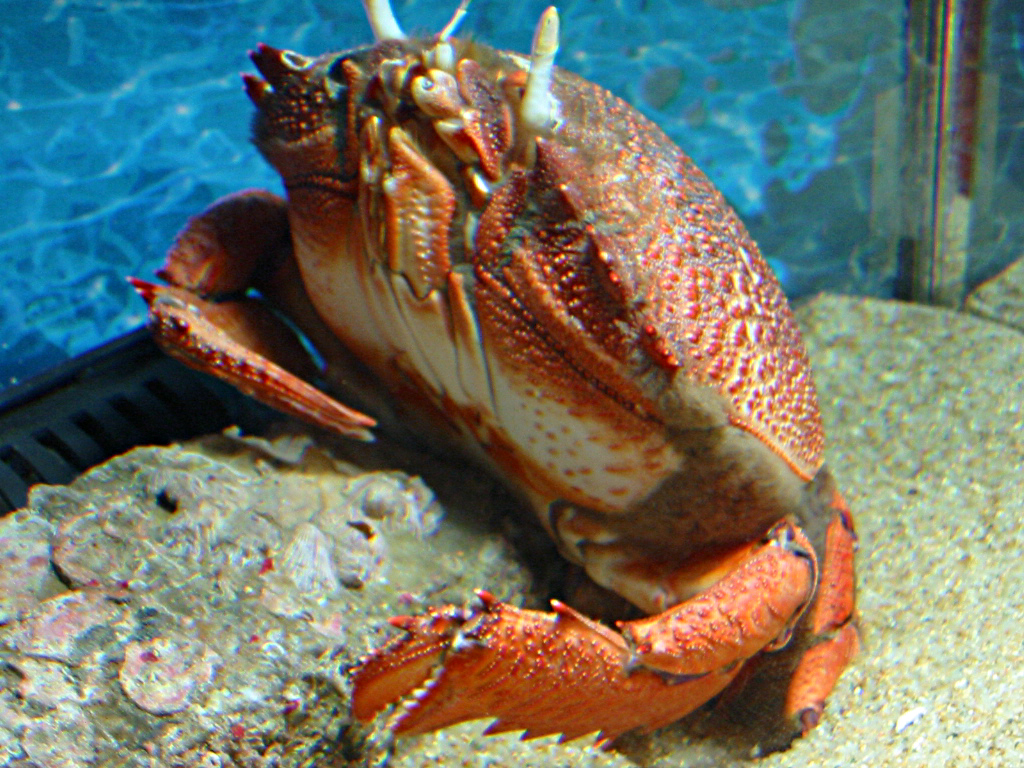
Ranina ranina (Raninoida)

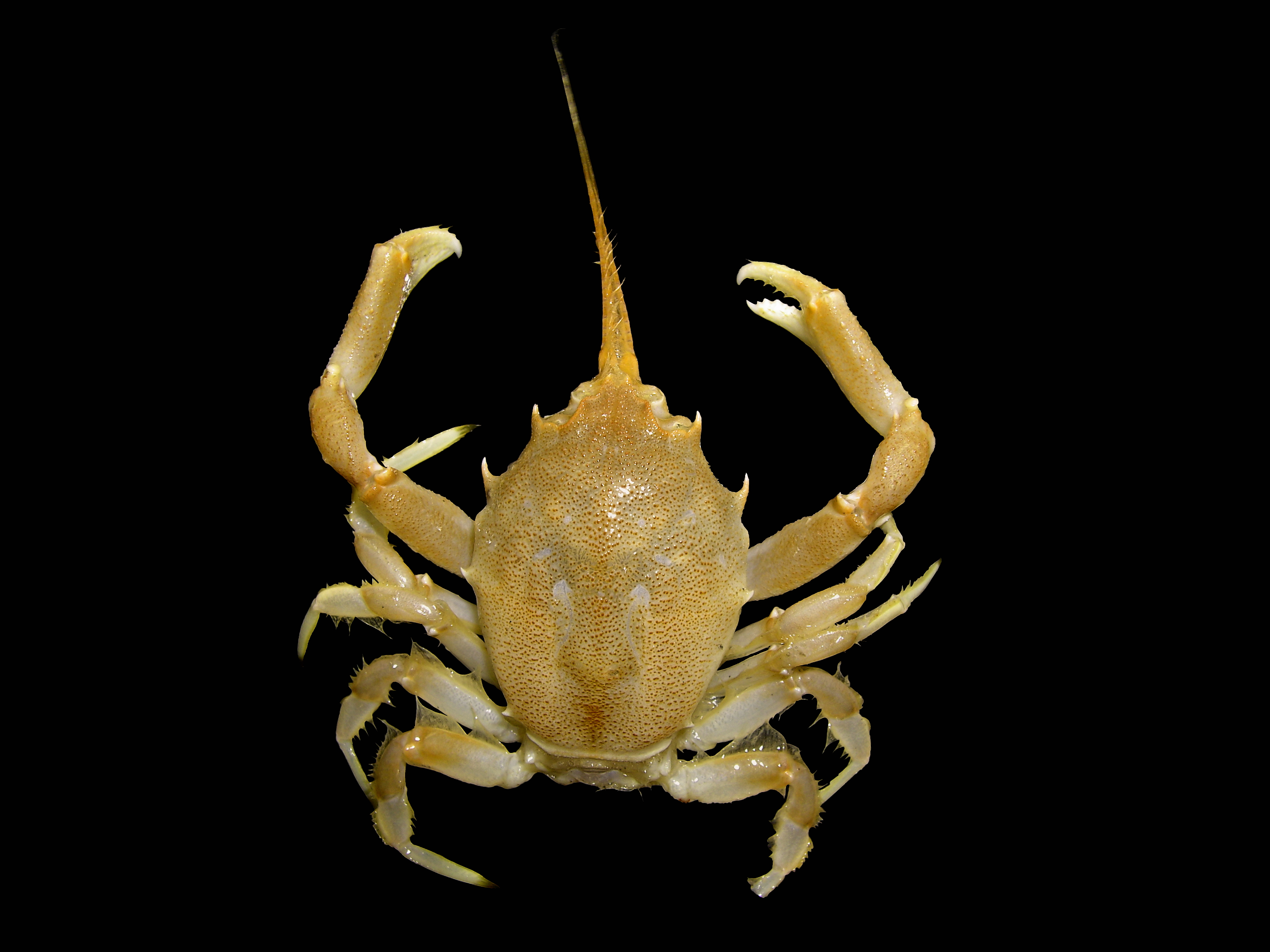
Corystes cassivelaunus (Heterotremata)

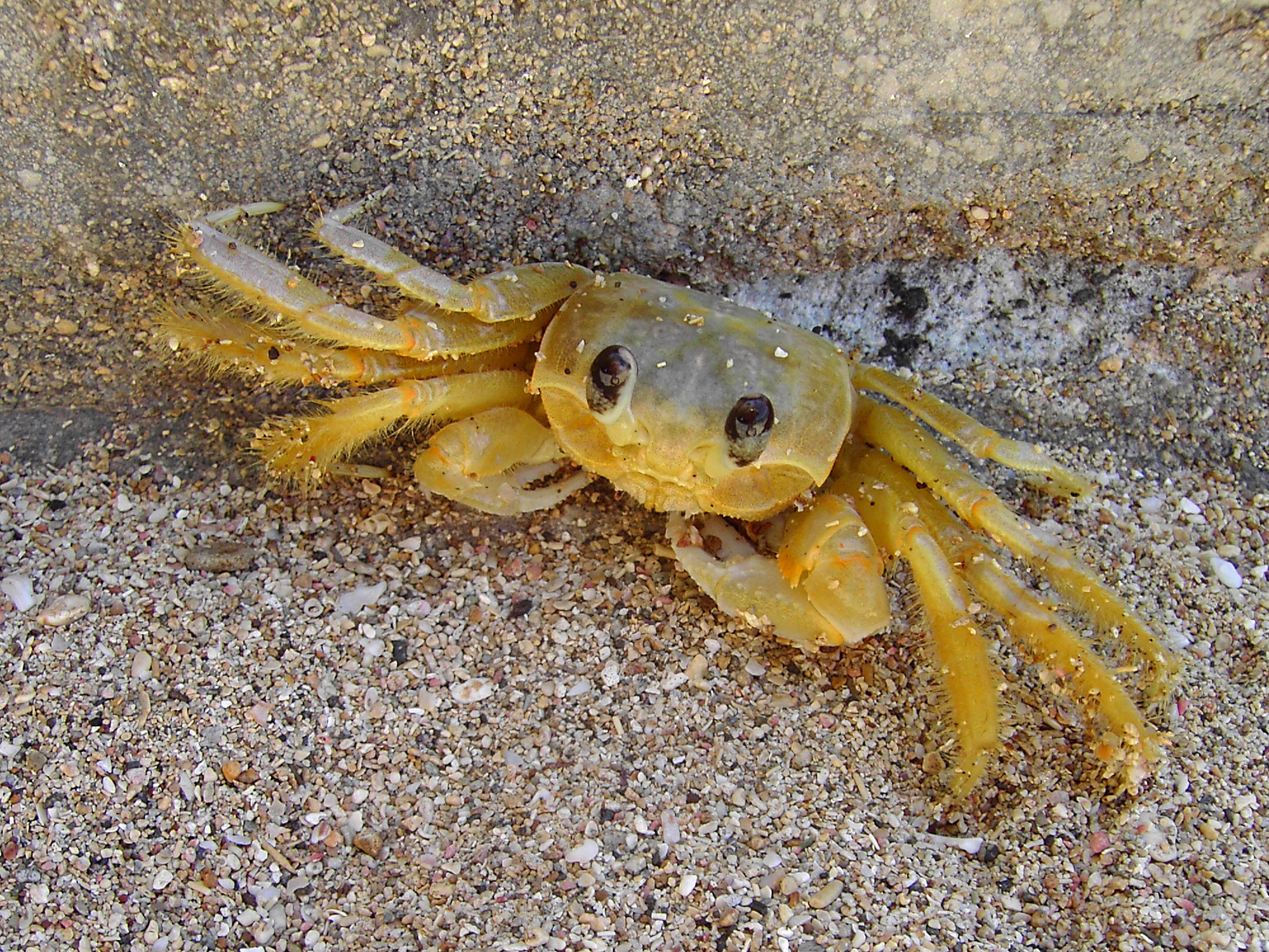
Ocypode quadrata (Thoracotremata)

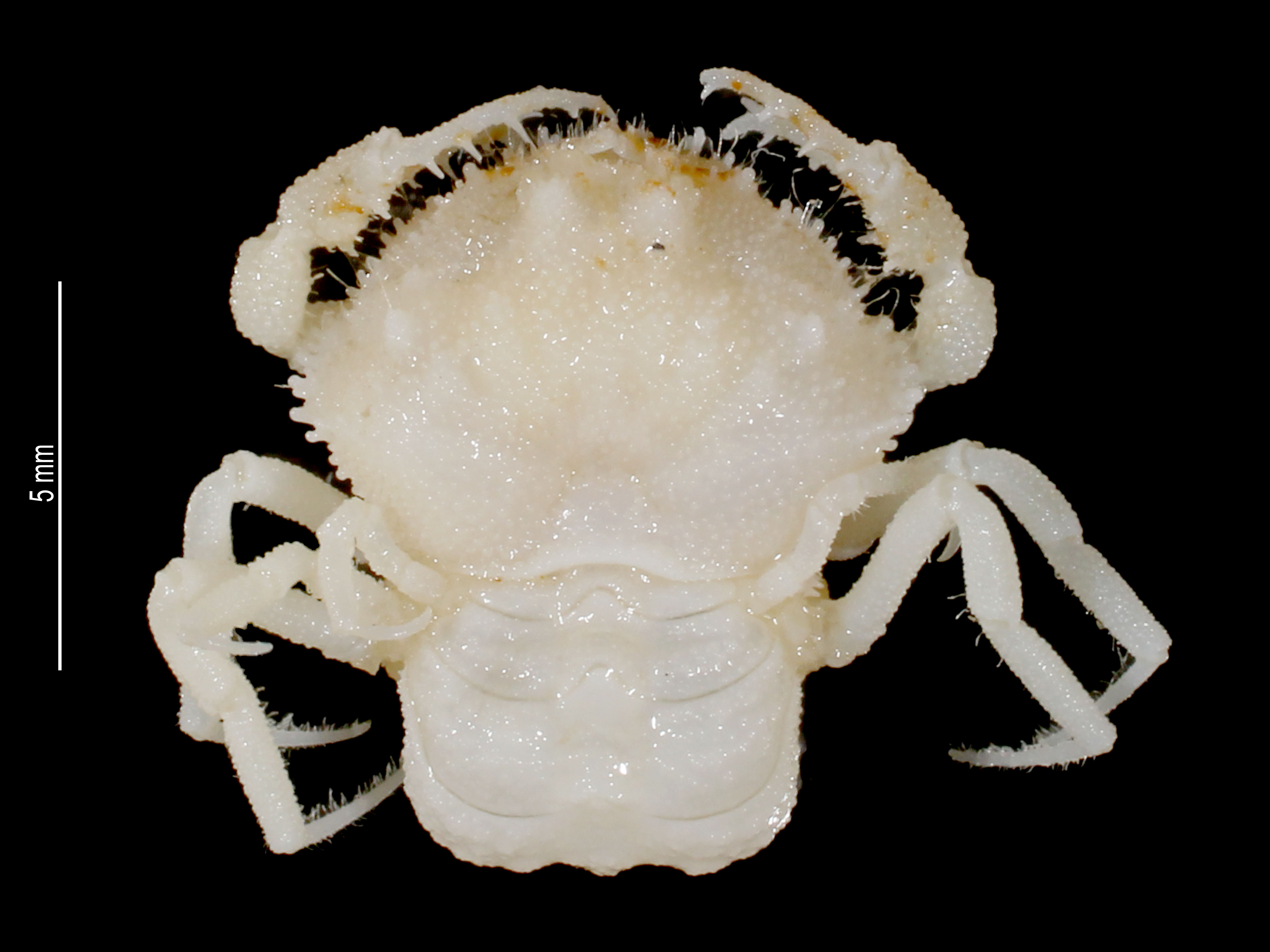
Corycodus disjunctipes (Cyclodorippoida)

- Section †Callichimaeroida
  - †Callichimaeroidea (1†)
- Section Dromiacea
  - †Dakoticancroidea (6†)
  - Dromioidea (147, 85†)
  - Glaessneropsoidea (45†)
  - Homolodromioidea (24, 107†)
  - Homoloidea (73, 49†)
- Section Raninoida (46, 196†)
- Section Cyclodorippoida (99, 27†)
- Section Eubrachyura
  - Subsection Heterotremata
    - Aethroidea (37, 44†)
    - Bellioidea (7)
    - Bythograeoidea (14)
    - Calappoidea (101, 71†)
    - Cancroidea (57, 81†)
    - Carpilioidea (4, 104†)
    - Cheiragonoidea (3, 13†)
    - Corystoidea (10, 5†)
    - †Componocancroidea (1†)
    - Dairoidea (4, 8†)
    - Dorippoidea (101, 73†)
    - Eriphioidea (67, 14†)
    - Gecarcinucoidea (349)
    - Goneplacoidea (182, 94†)
    - Hexapodoidea (21, 25†)
    - Leucosioidea (488, 113†)
    - Majoidea (980, 89†)
    - Orithyioidea (1)
    - Palicoidea (63, 6†)
    - Parthenopoidea (144, 36†)
    - Pilumnoidea (405, 47†)
    - Portunoidea (455, 200†)
    - Potamoidea (662, 8†)
    - Pseudothelphusoidea (276)
    - Pseudozioidea (22, 6†)
    - Retroplumoidea (10, 27†)
    - Trapezioidea (58, 10†)
    - Trichodactyloidea (50)
    - Xanthoidea (736, 134†)
  - Subsection Thoracotremata
    - Cryptochiroidea (46)
    - Grapsoidea (493, 28†)
    - Ocypodoidea (304, 14†)
    - Pinnotheroidea (304, 13†)

21st century studies have found the following superfamilies and families to not be monophyletic, but rather paraphyletic or polyphyletic:

- The Thoracotremata superfamily Grapsoidea is polyphyletic
- The Thoracotremata superfamily Ocypodoidea is polyphyletic
- The Heterotremata superfamily Calappoidea is polyphyletic
- The Heterotremata superfamily Eriphioidea is polyphyletic
- The Heterotremata superfamily Goneplacoidea is polyphyletic
- The Heterotremata superfamily Potamoidea is paraphyletic with respect to Gecarcinucoidea, which is resolved by placing Gecarcinucidae within Potamoidea
- The Majoidea families Epialtidae, Mithracidae and Majidae are polyphyletic with respect to each other
- The Dromioidea family Dromiidae may be paraphyletic with respect to Dynomenidae
- The Homoloidea family Homolidae is paraphyletic with respect to Latreilliidae
- The Xanthoidea family Xanthidae is paraphyletic with respect to Panopeidae

== Human consumption ==
=== Fisheries ===
True crabs make up 20% of all marine crustaceans caught, farmed, and consumed worldwide, amounting to 1.5 million tonnes annually. One species, Portunus trituberculatus, accounts for one-fifth of that total. Other commercially important taxa include Portunus pelagicus, several species in the genus Chionoecetes, the blue crab (Callinectes sapidus), Charybdis spp., Cancer pagurus, the Dungeness crab (Metacarcinus magister), and Scylla serrata, each of which yields more than 20,000 tonnes annually.

In some species, meat is harvested by manually twisting and pulling off one or both claws and returning the live crab to the water in the knowledge that it may survive and regenerate the claws.

=== Crabs as food ===
In Southeast Asia, mud crabs (Scylla serrata) are cooked with chilli peppers to make the "sweet, yet savoury" chilli crab. In Goa and Mozambique, crab curry is a typical dish, flavoured with chilis, garlic, coconut, and spices. For the British dish dressed crab, the crab meat is extracted and placed inside the hard shell. In the Chesapeake Bay region of Maryland, crab meat is mixed with mayonnaise, mustard, and breadcrumbs to make crab cakes. Crabs can be made into a bisque, a smooth, creamy, seasoned soup of French origin. Crab sticks, also called surimi, are made from minced fish meat that is crafted and colored to resemble crab meat. It is a popular sushi ingredient in Japan and South Korea.

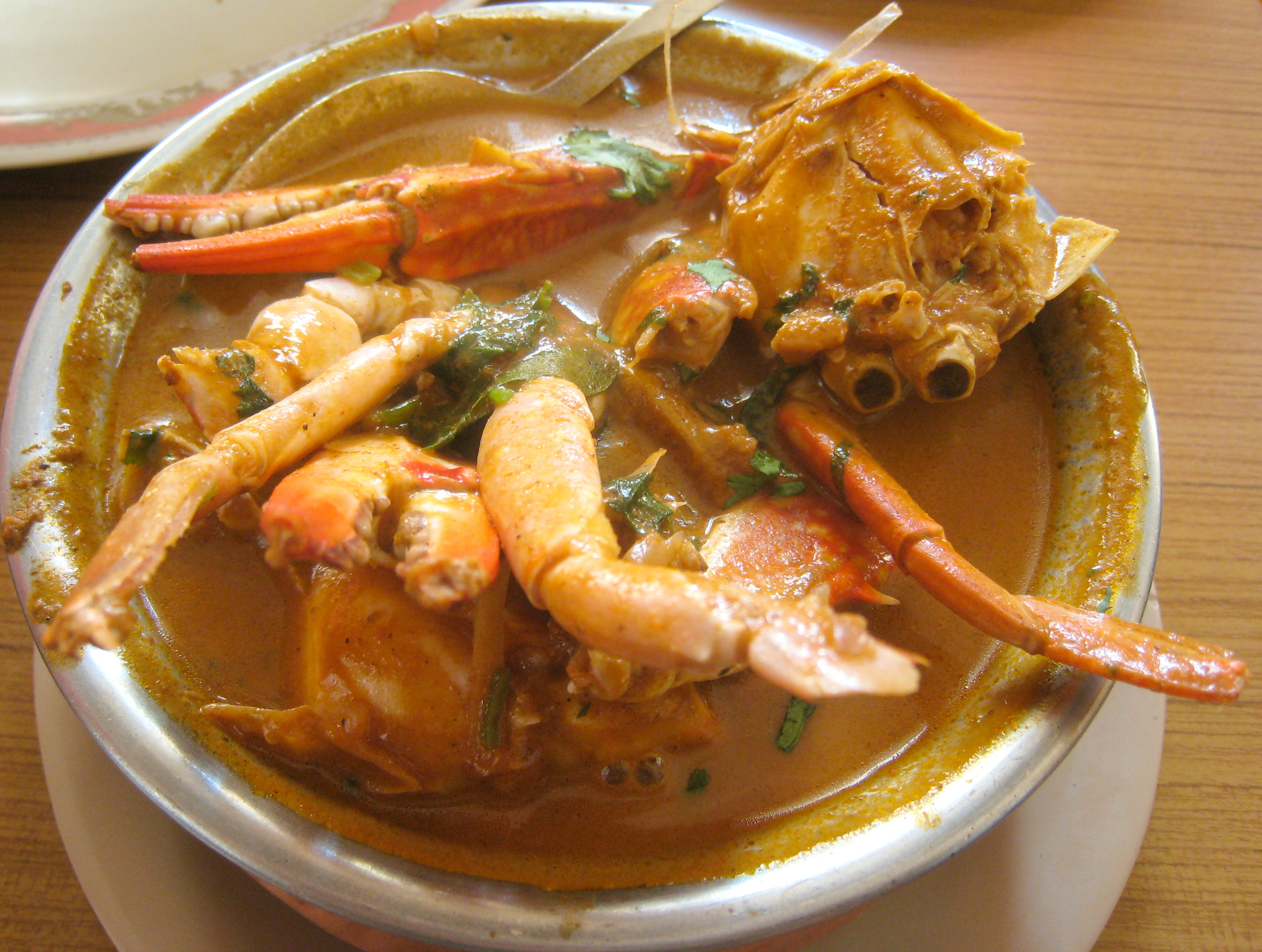
Crab masala from Karnataka, India

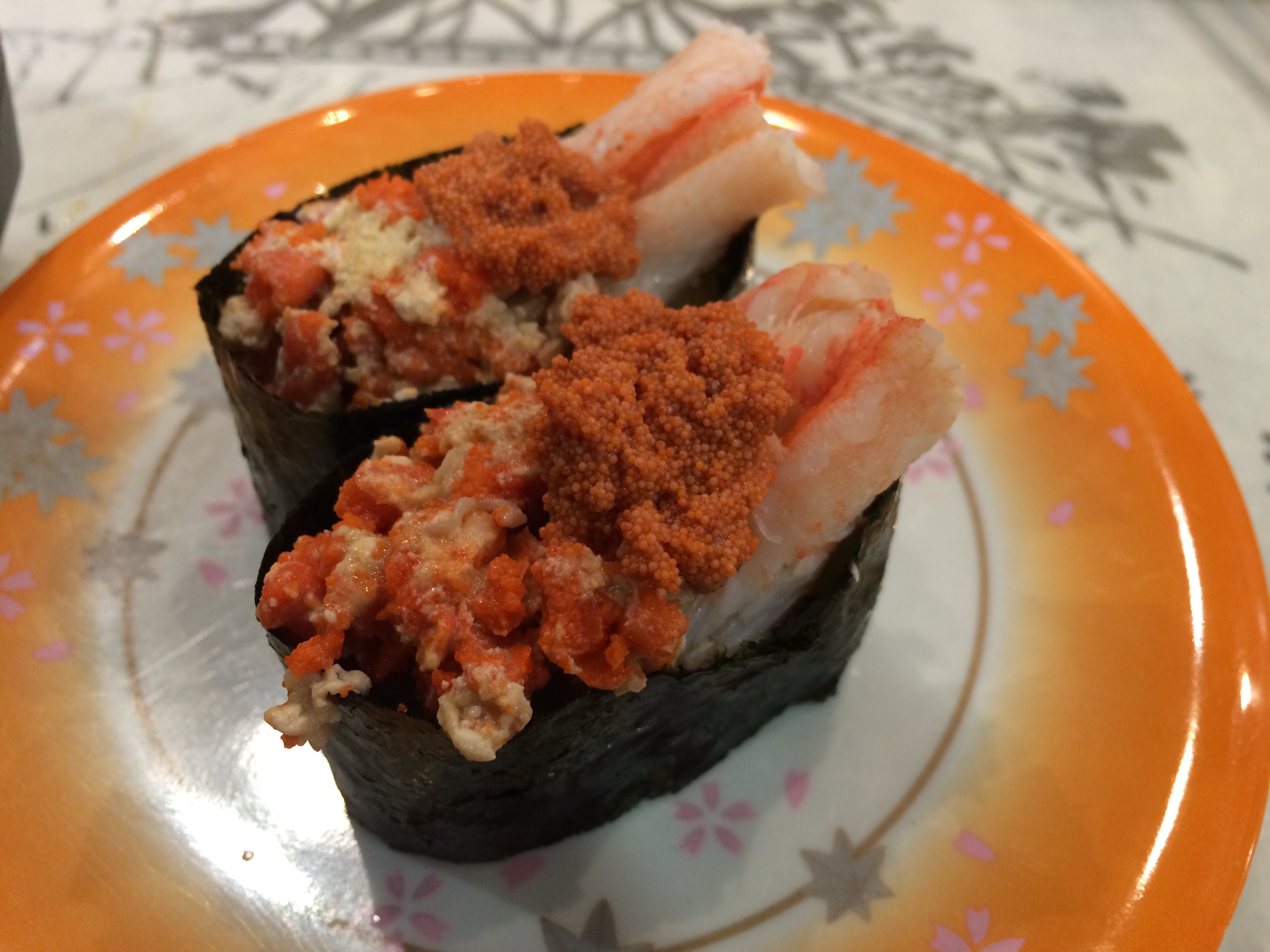
Sushi with crab meat and eggs

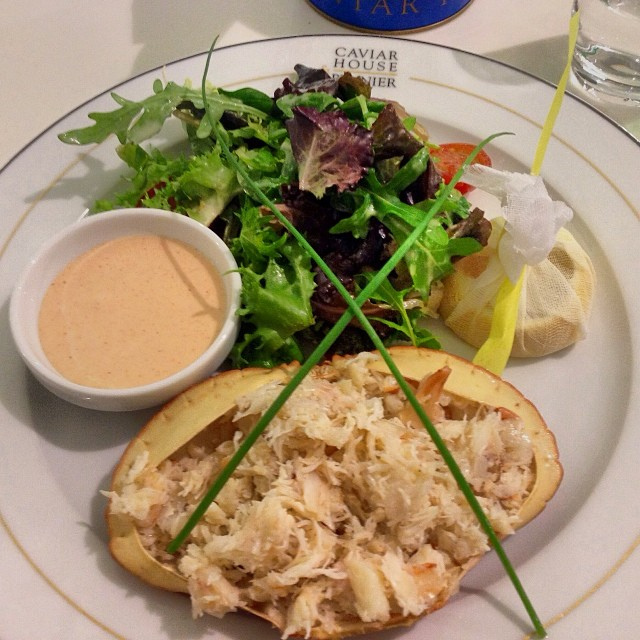
Dressed crab

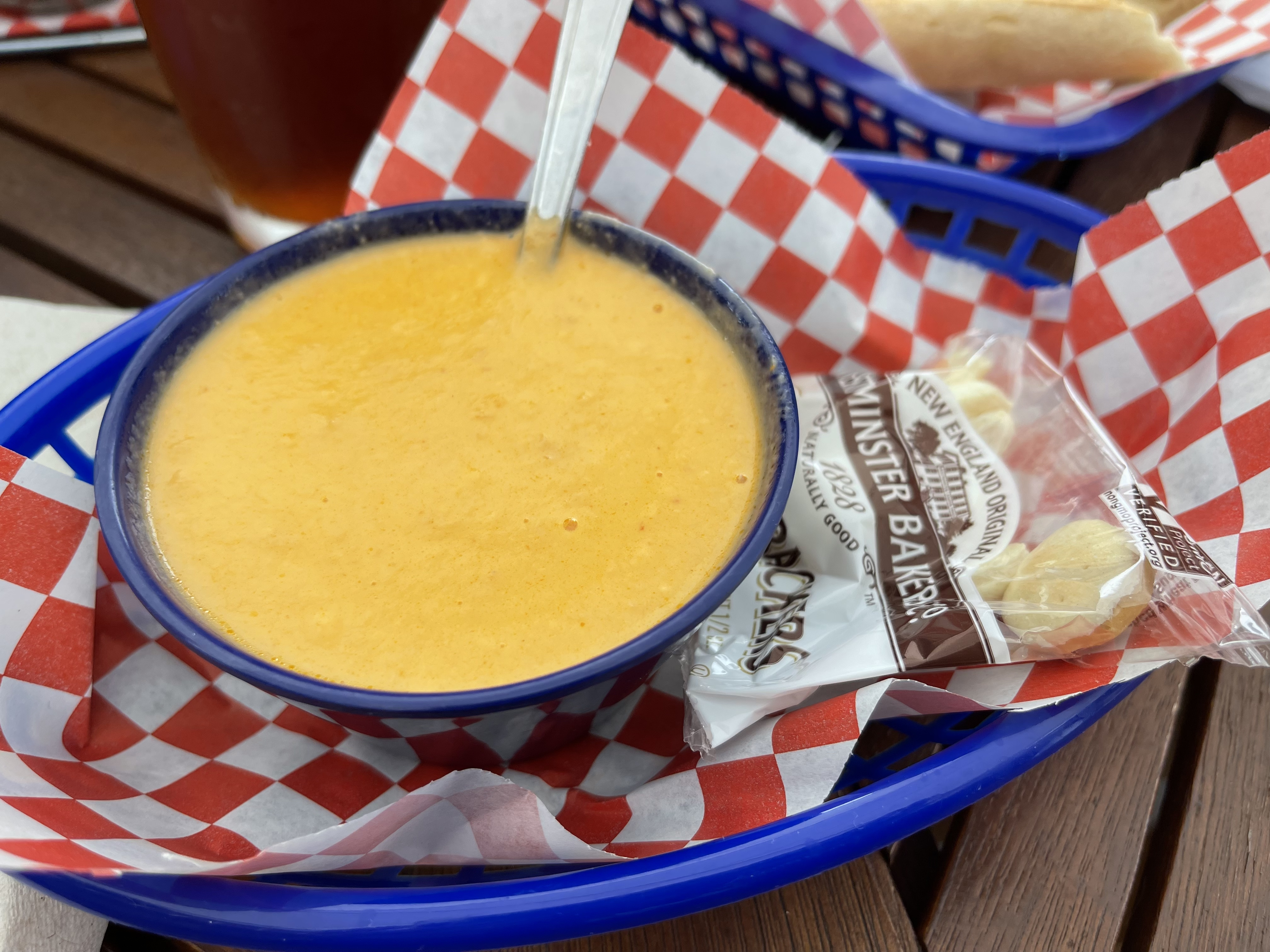
Crab bisque

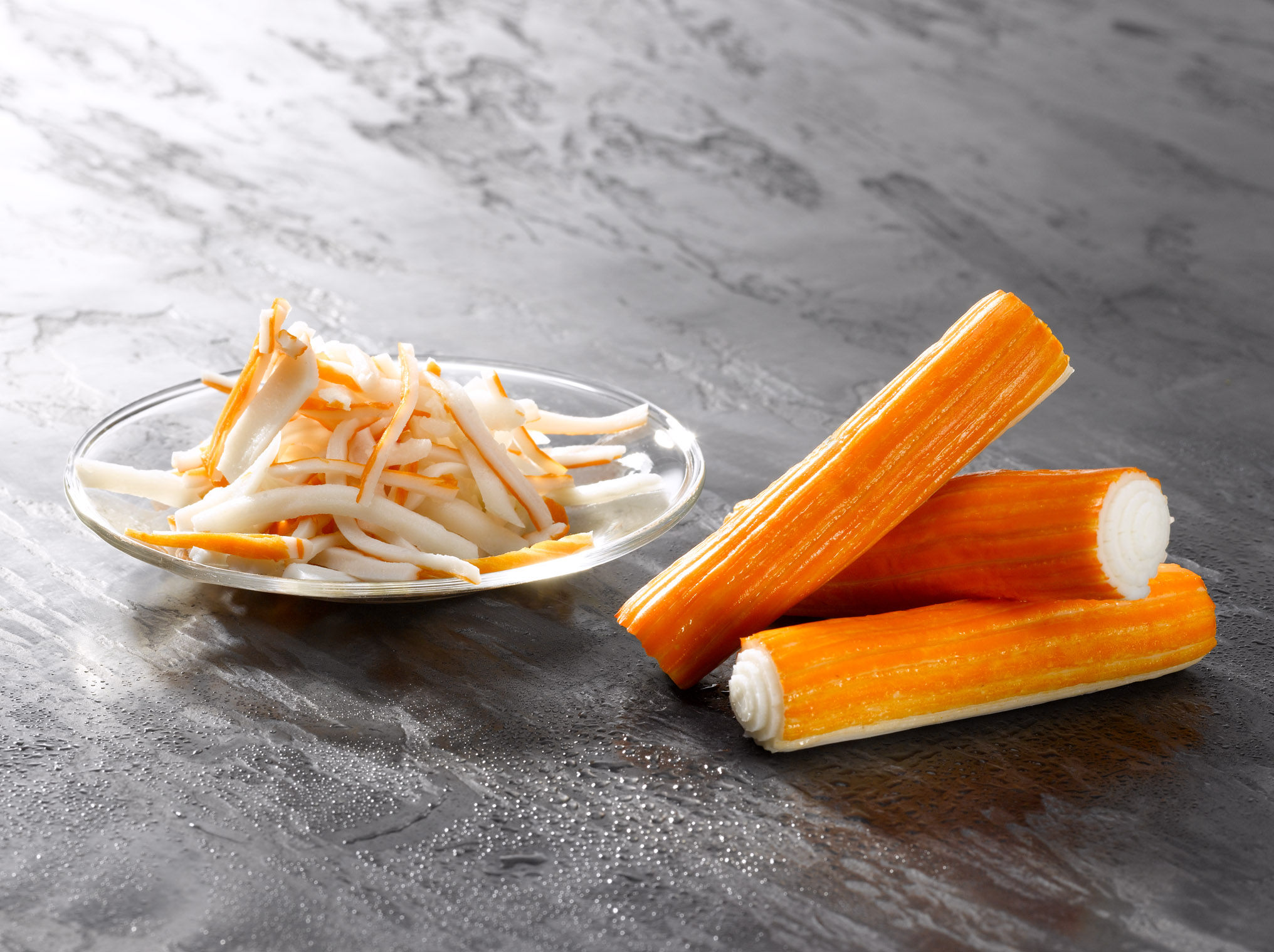
Crab sticks (surimi)

== Cultural influences ==
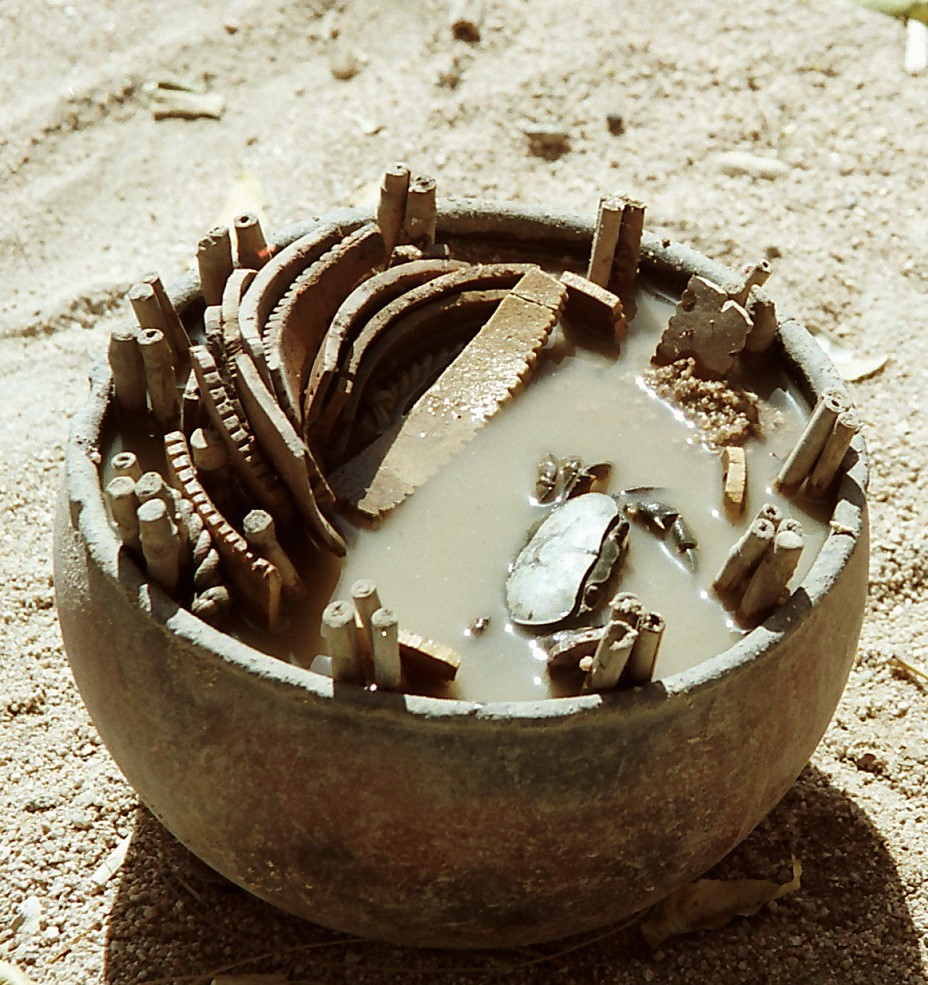
A crab divination pot in Kapsiki, North Cameroon.

Both the constellation Cancer and the astrological sign Cancer are named after the crab, and depicted as a crab. William Parsons, 3rd Earl of Rosse drew the Crab Nebula in 1848 and noticed its similarity to the animal; the Crab Pulsar lies at the centre of the nebula. The Moche people of ancient Peru often depicted crabs in their art. In Greek mythology, Karkinos was a crab that came to the aid of the Lernaean Hydra as it battled Heracles. One of Rudyard Kipling's Just So Stories, The Crab that Played with the Sea, tells the story of a gigantic crab who made the waters of the sea go up and down, like the tides. In Malay mythology (as related by Hugh Clifford to Walter William Skeat), ocean tides are believed to be caused by water rushing in and out of a hole in the Navel of the Seas (Pusat Tasek), where "there sits a gigantic crab which twice a day gets out in order to search for food".

The Kapsiki people of North Cameroon use the way crabs handle objects for divination.
