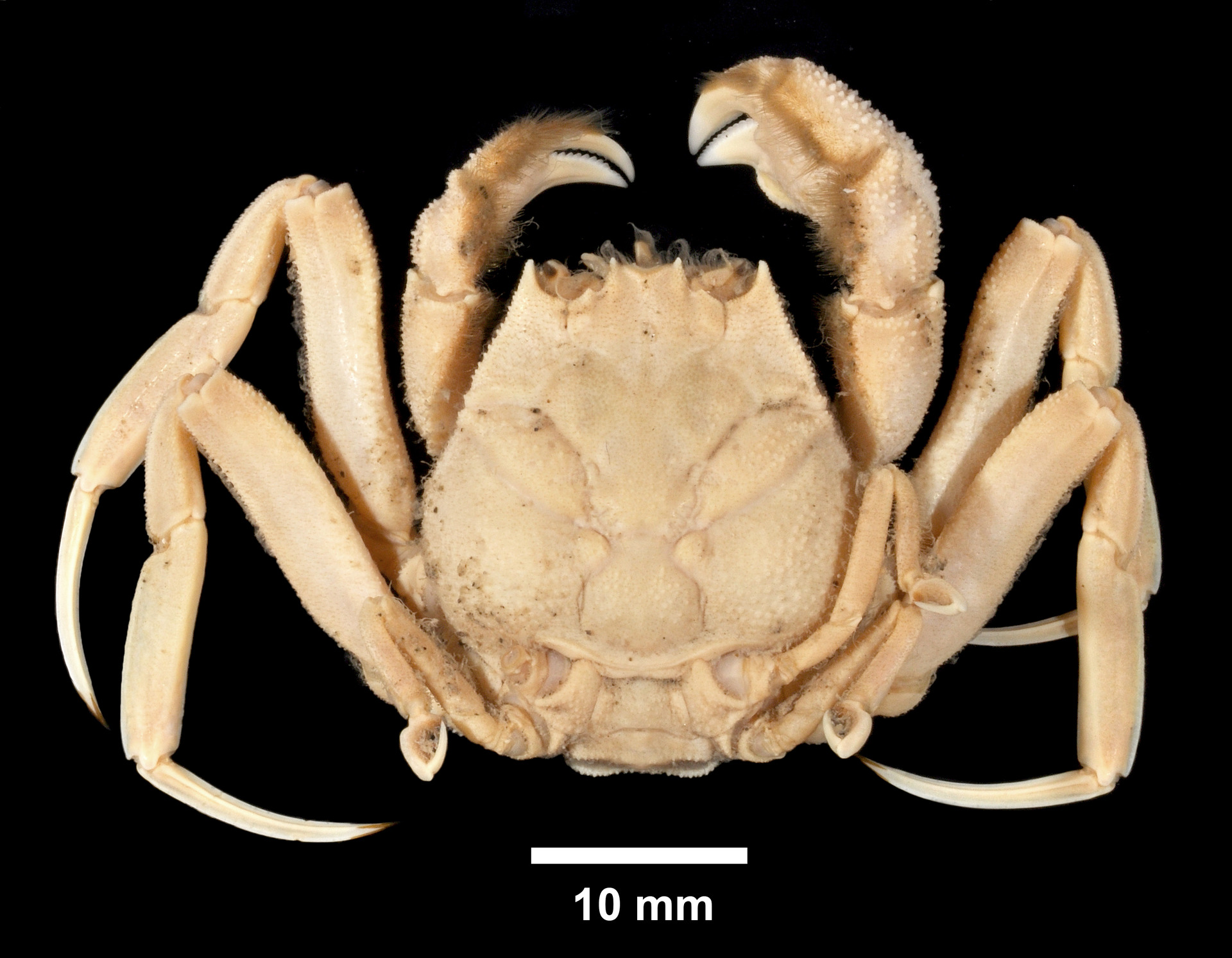
- Paradorippe granulata

Scientific classification
- Kingdom: Animalia
- Phylum: Arthropoda
- Clade: Pancrustacea
- Class: Malacostraca
- Order: Decapoda
- Suborder: Pleocyemata
- Infraorder: Brachyura
- Subsection: Heterotremata
- Superfamily: Dorippoidea; Macleay, 1838

Families
- Dorippidae; Ethusidae; †Goniochelidae; †Telamonocarcinidae; †Tepexicarcinidae (?)

= Dorippoidea =

Dorippoidea Temporal range: Late Cretaceous–Recent

Superfamily of crabs

Dorippoidea is a superfamily of crabs. The earliest fossils attributable to the Dorippoidea date from the Late Cretaceous.

Dorippoidea contains the following families:

- Dorippidae Macleay, 1838
- Ethusidae Guinot, 1977
- †Goniochelidae Schweitzer & Feldmann, 2011
- †Telamonocarcinidae Larghi, 2004
- †Tepexicarcinidae (?) Luque, 2015
