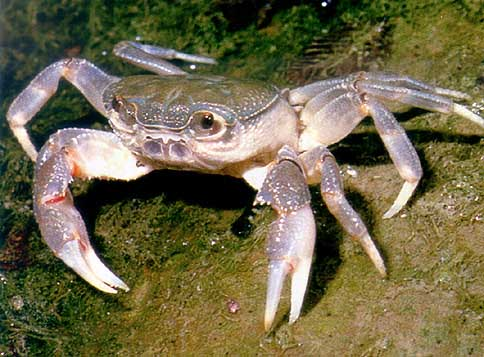
- Potamon fluviatile

Scientific classification
- Kingdom: Animalia
- Phylum: Arthropoda
- Clade: Pancrustacea
- Class: Malacostraca
- Order: Decapoda
- Suborder: Pleocyemata
- Infraorder: Brachyura
- Subsection: Heterotremata
- Superfamily: Potamoidea; Ortmann, 1896

Families
- Deckeniidae; Potamidae; Potamonautidae

= Potamoidea =

Superfamily of crabs

Potamoidea is a superfamily of freshwater crabs, comprising the two families Potamidae and Potamonautidae. Two previously recognised families, Deckeniidae and Platythelphusidae, are now treated as parts of the family Potamonautidae.
