= Scalopidiidae =

Scientific classification
- Kingdom: Animalia
- Phylum: Arthropoda
- Class: Malacostraca
- Order: Decapoda
- Suborder: Pleocyemata
- Infraorder: Brachyura
- Superfamily: Goneplacoidea
- Family: Scalopidiidae

Family of crabs

Scalopidiidae is a family of crabs in the superfamily Goneplacoidea. It contains the following genera:

- Caenopedia Ng & Castro, 2013
- Scalopidia Stimpson, 1858
