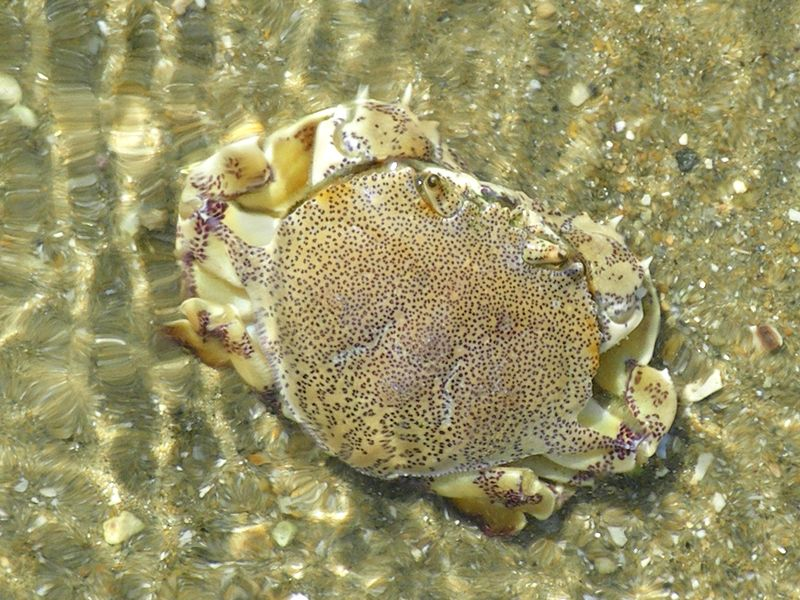
- Ashtoret lunaris, dorsal side
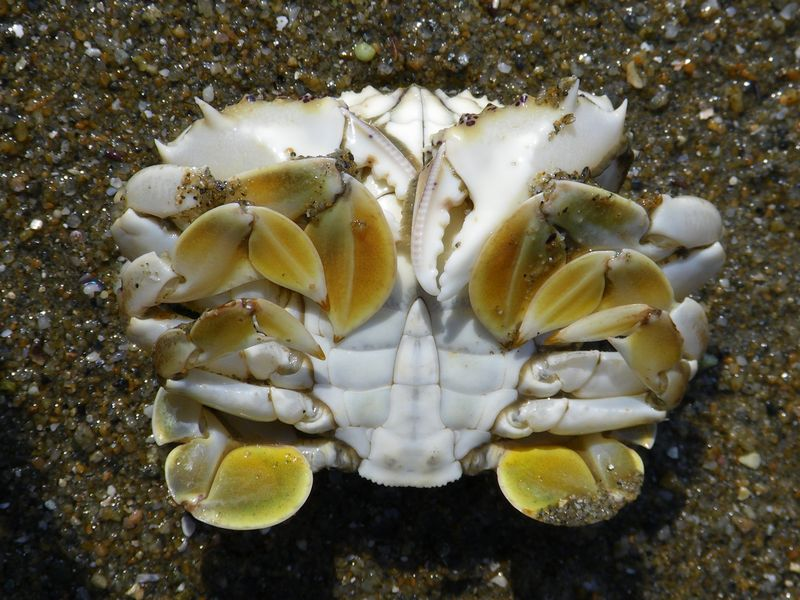
- Male Ashtoret lunaris, ventral side

Scientific classification
- Kingdom: Animalia
- Phylum: Arthropoda
- Clade: Pancrustacea
- Class: Malacostraca
- Order: Decapoda
- Suborder: Pleocyemata
- Clade: Reptantia
- Infraorder: Brachyura
- Section: Eubrachyura
- Subsection: Heterotremata
- Superfamily: Calappoidea
- Family: Matutidae; De Haan, 1835

Genera
- See text

= Matutidae =

Matutidae Temporal range: Middle Eocene–Recent

Family of crabs

Matutidae is a family of crabs, sometimes called moon crabs, adapted for swimming or digging. They differ from the swimming crabs of the family Portunidae in that all five pairs of legs are flattened, rather than just the last pair, as in Portunidae. Crabs in the Matutidae are aggressive predators.

== Taxonomy ==
Traditionally, this taxon contained the single genus Matuta, and was considered a subfamily of the Calappidae. Now, the group is ranked as a family and six genera (four extant and two fossil) are now recognised. Although placed in the Calappoidea, it is not clear that Matutidae and Calappidae are closely related.

- Ashtoret Galil & P. F. Clark, 1994
- † Eomatuta De Angeli & Marchiori, 2009
- Izanami Galil & P. F. Clark, 1994
- Matuta Weber, 1795
- Mebeli Galil & P. F. Clark, 1994
- † Szaboa Müller & Galil, 1998
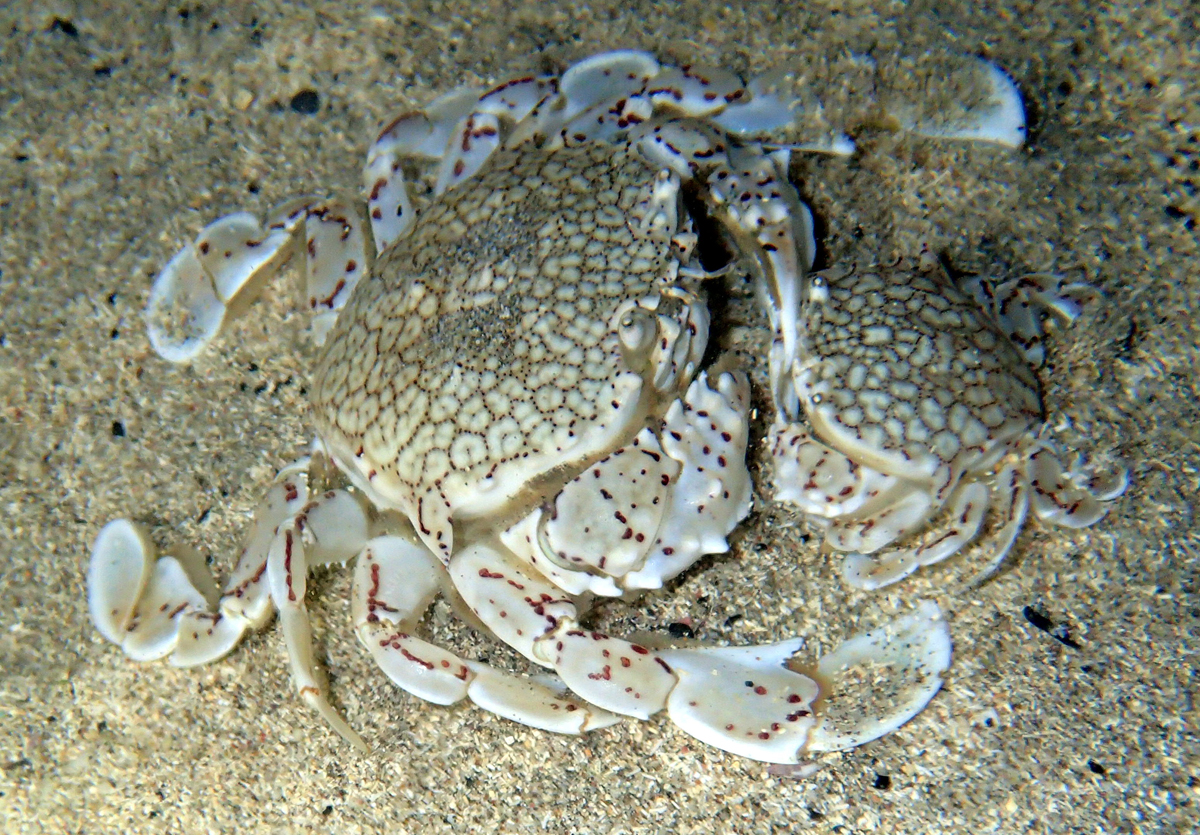
Ashtoret picta

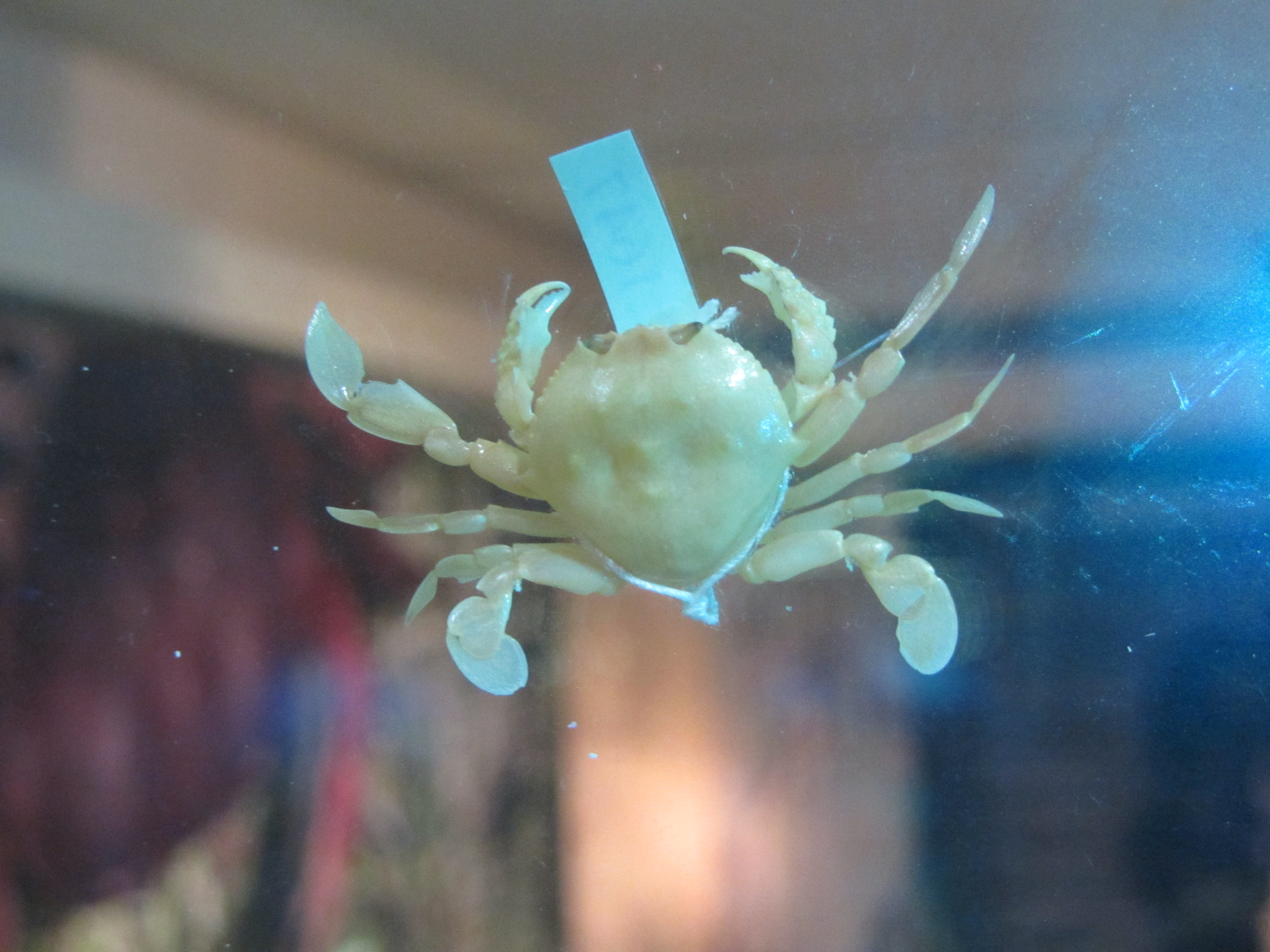
Izanami curtispina

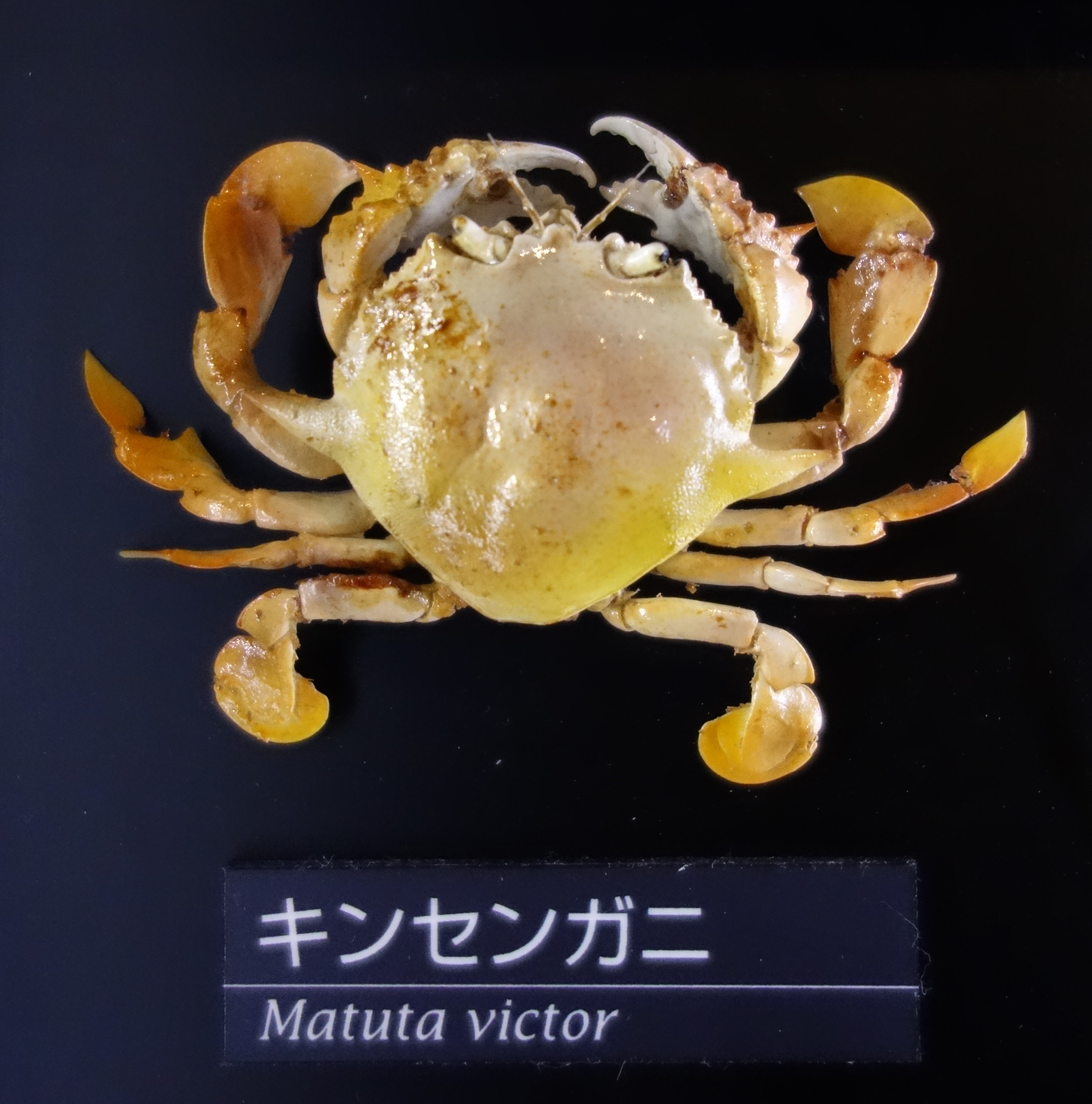
Matuta victor

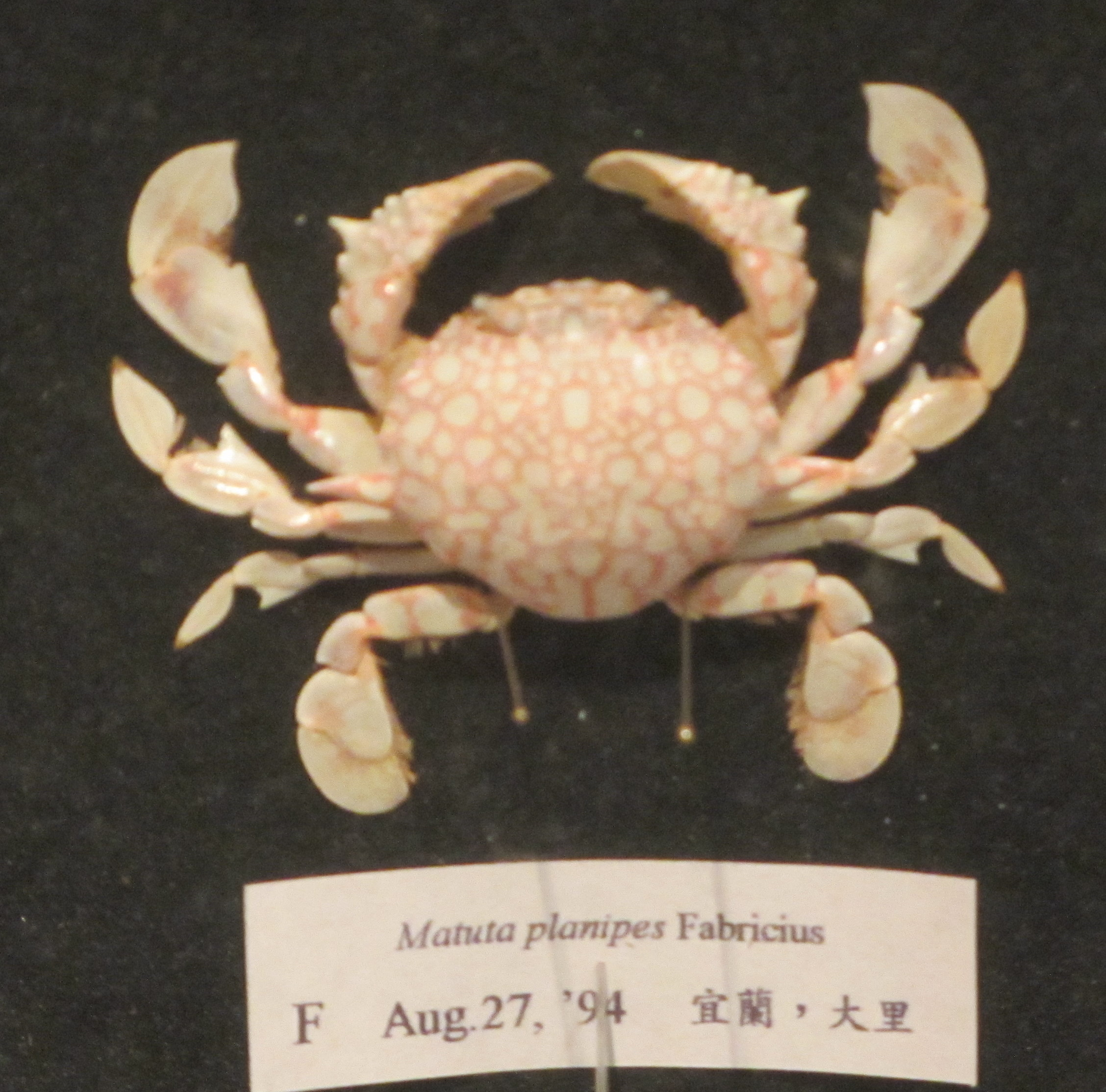
Matuta planipes

== Fossil record ==
Szaboa is known only from Hungarian fossil deposits of Middle Miocene age. Eomatuta was described from the Middle Eocene of Italy in 2009. Fossils of Ashtoret have also been found in Miocene deposits in Japan.
