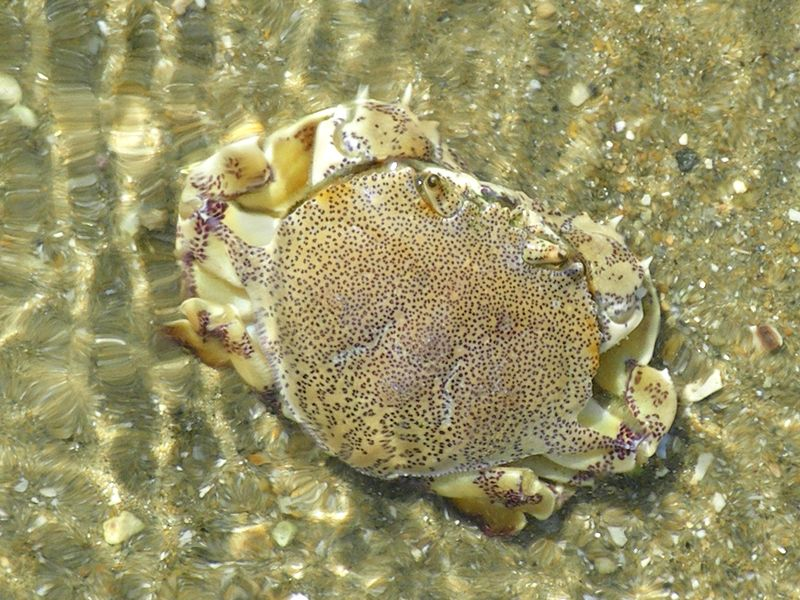
- Ashtoret lunaris, dorsal side

Scientific classification
- Kingdom: Animalia
- Phylum: Arthropoda
- Class: Malacostraca
- Order: Decapoda
- Suborder: Pleocyemata
- Infraorder: Brachyura
- Family: Matutidae
- Genus: Ashtoret; Galil & Clark, 1994

= Ashtoret =

Ashtoret Temporal range: Miocene–Recent

Genus of crabs

Ashtoret is a genus of crabs in the family Matutidae, containing the following species:

- Ashtoret granulosa (Miers, 1877)
- Ashtoret lunaris (Forskål, 1775)
- Ashtoret maculata (Miers, 1877)
- Ashtoret miersii (Henderson, 1887)
- Ashtoret obtusifrons (Miers, 1877)
- Ashtoret picta (Hess, 1865)
- Ashtoret sangiannulata Galil & Clark, 1994
- Ashtoret shengmuae Galil & Clark, 1994
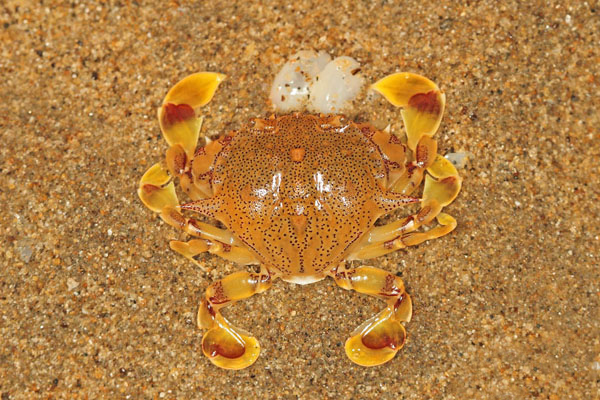
Ashtoret lunaris

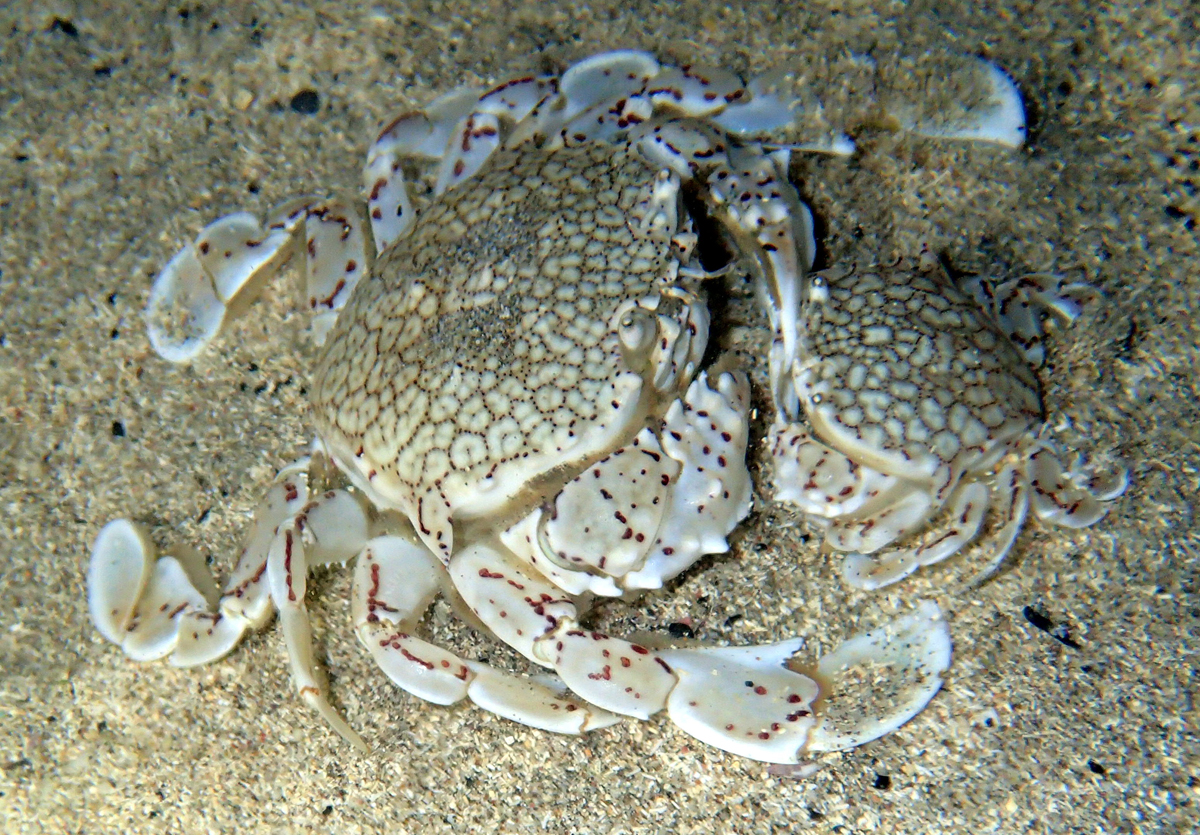
Ashtoret picta

In addition, a single, unnamed, fossil species is known from the Miocene of Japan.
