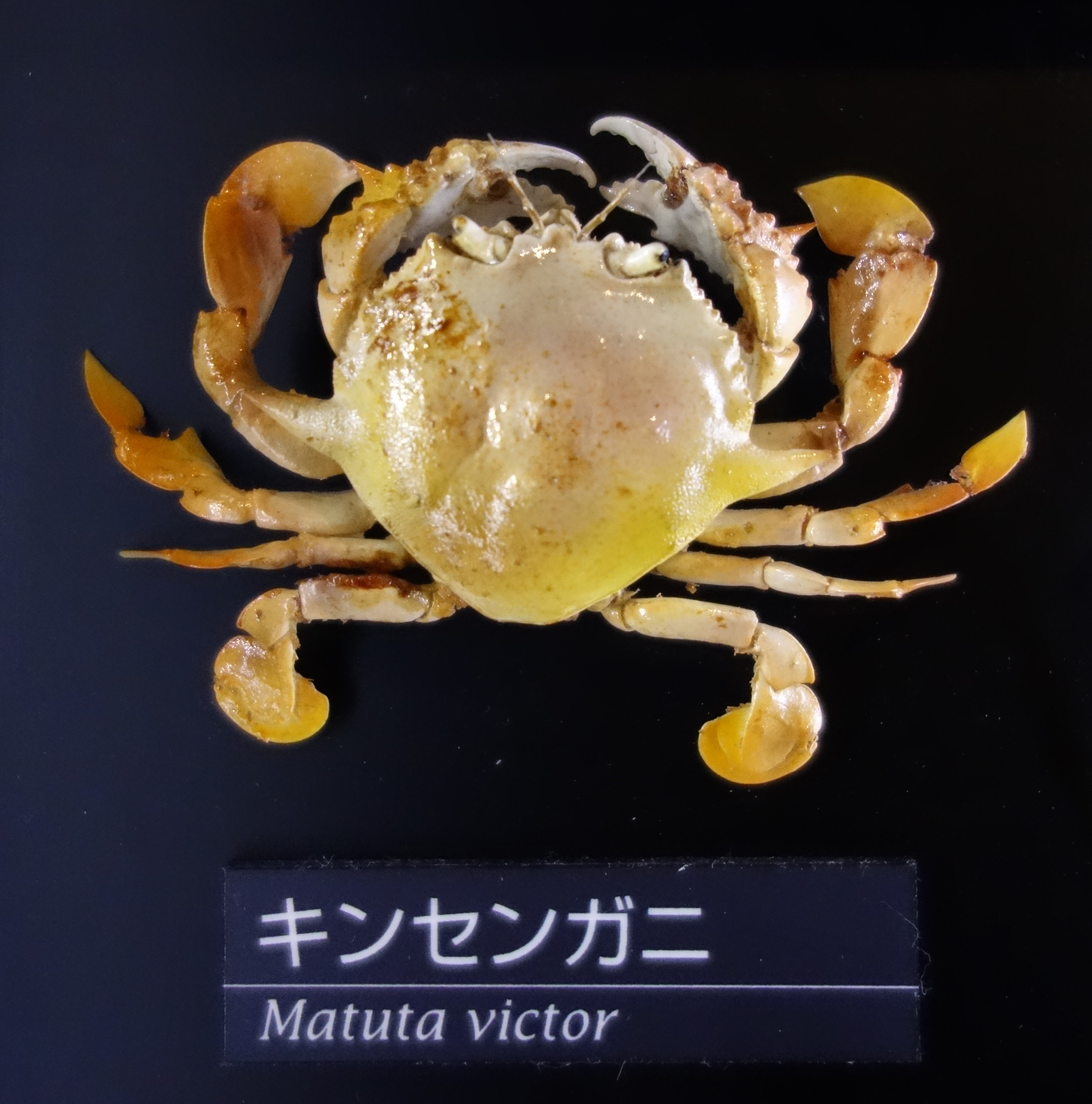
- Matuta victor

Scientific classification
- Kingdom: Animalia
- Phylum: Arthropoda
- Class: Malacostraca
- Order: Decapoda
- Suborder: Pleocyemata
- Infraorder: Brachyura
- Family: Matutidae
- Genus: Matuta; Weber, 1795

= Matuta =

Genus of crabs

Matuta is a genus of crabs in the family Matutidae, containing the following species:

- Matuta circulifera Miers, 1880
- †Matuta inermis Brocchi, 1883
- Matuta planipes Fabricius, 1798
- Matuta purnama Lai & Galil, 2007
- Matuta victor (Fabricius, 1781)
