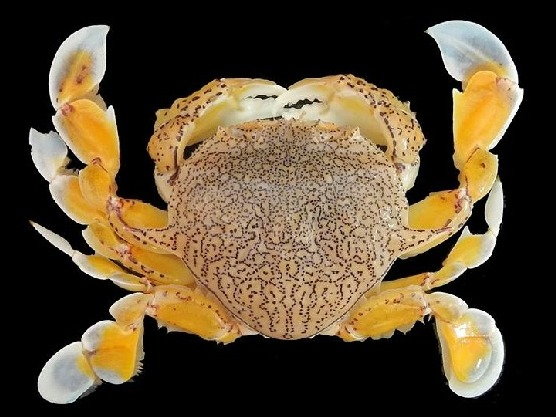

Scientific classification
- Kingdom: Animalia
- Phylum: Arthropoda
- Class: Malacostraca
- Order: Decapoda
- Suborder: Pleocyemata
- Infraorder: Brachyura
- Family: Matutidae
- Genus: Matuta
- Species: M. planipes

Binomial name
- Matuta planipes Fabricius, 1798

= Matuta planipes =

Species of crab

Matuta planipes is a species of moon crab in the family Matutidae. It is a small colorful crab with flattened limbs. Matuta planipes, in contrast to other species of crabs inhale pure oxygen-water through an area near their eye sockets. This species of crabs enjoy spending their daytime hidden under some sort of shade such as a sand bed and they are more active during the night.

This species of crab comes from the tropical waters of the Indo-Pacific and Australia. Additionally, they have a widespread distribution that extends from the Red Sea to South Africa, Asia, and Australia.
