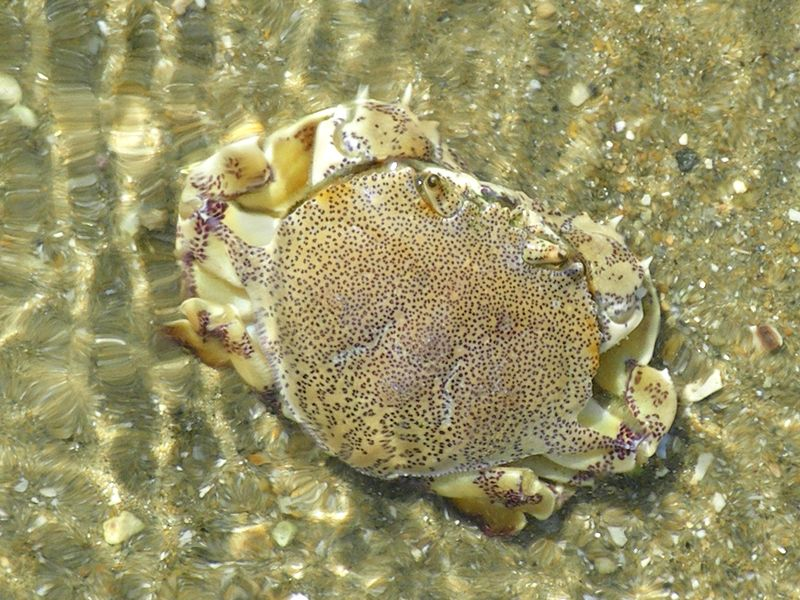

Scientific classification
- Kingdom: Animalia
- Phylum: Arthropoda
- Clade: Pancrustacea
- Class: Malacostraca
- Order: Decapoda
- Suborder: Pleocyemata
- Infraorder: Brachyura
- Family: Matutidae
- Genus: Matuta
- Species: M. victor

Binomial name
- Matuta victor Fabricius, 1781

= Matuta victor =

Species of crab

Matuta victor, also known as the common moon crab, is a species of crab belonging to the family Matutidae. It is a medium-sized coastal crab, native to the warm beaches of the Indo-Pacific. It has also been introduced to the Mediterranean Sea.

Like other crabs in the family Matutidae, all five pairs of legs are flattened, adapted for rapid swimming, and to bury themselves quickly in the substrate. They are predatory crabs.
