= Mebeli =

Scientific classification
- Kingdom: Animalia
- Phylum: Arthropoda
- Class: Malacostraca
- Order: Decapoda
- Suborder: Pleocyemata
- Infraorder: Brachyura
- Family: Matutidae
- Genus: Mebeli; Galil & Clark, 1994
- Species: M. michaelseni

Binomial name
- Mebeli michaelseni (Balss, 1921)

Synonyms
- Matuta michaelseni Balss, 1921

Genus of crabs

Mebeli michaelseni is a species of crab in the family Matutidae, and is the only species in the genus Mebeli.
