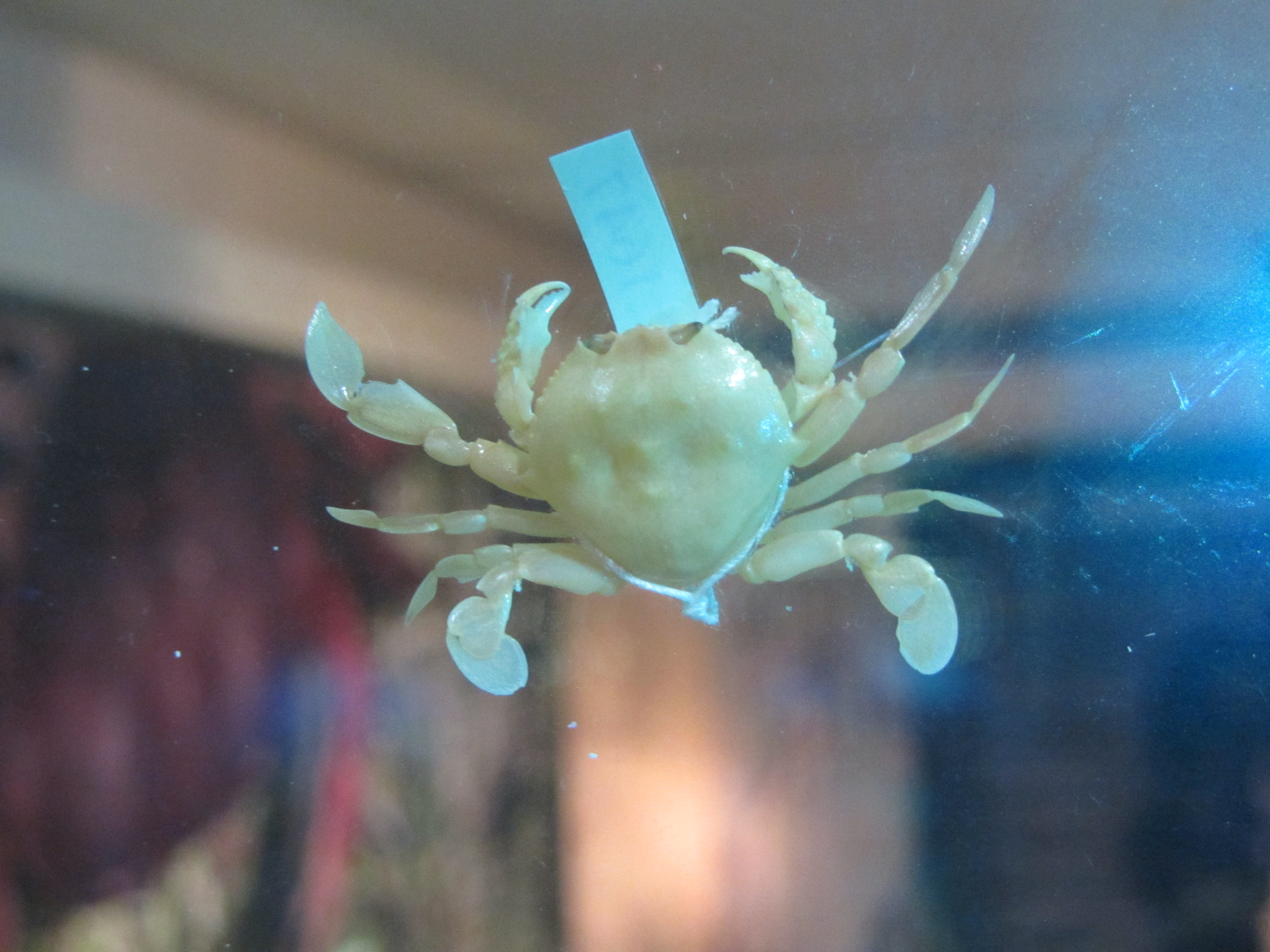
- Specimen of Izanami curtispina

Scientific classification
- Kingdom: Animalia
- Phylum: Arthropoda
- Class: Malacostraca
- Order: Decapoda
- Suborder: Pleocyemata
- Infraorder: Brachyura
- Family: Matutidae
- Genus: Izanami; Galil & Clark, 1994

= Izanami (crab) =

Genus of crabs

Izanami is a genus of crabs in the family Matutidae, containing the following species:

- Izanami curtispina (Sakai, 1961)
- Izanami reticulata Müller & Galil, 1998
