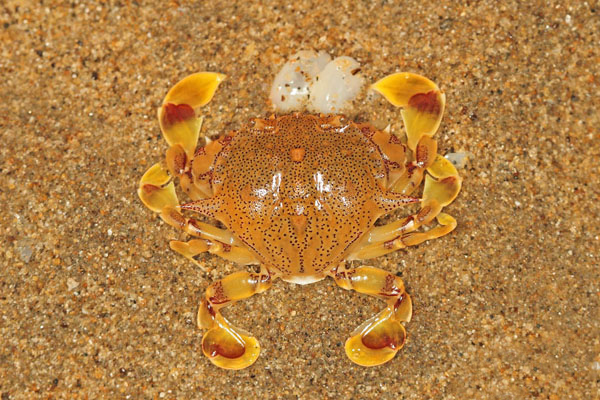

Scientific classification
- Kingdom: Animalia
- Phylum: Arthropoda
- Class: Malacostraca
- Order: Decapoda
- Suborder: Pleocyemata
- Infraorder: Brachyura
- Family: Matutidae
- Genus: Ashtoret
- Species: A. lunaris

Binomial name
- Ashtoret lunaris (Forskål), 1775

Synonyms
- Cancer lunaris Forsskål, 1775; Matuta banksi Leach, 1817; Matuta banksii Leach, 1817; Matuta lunaris (Forsskål, 1775)

= Ashtoret lunaris =

Species of crab

Ashtoret lunaris, also known as the yellow moon crab, spotted moon crab or box crab, is an Indo-Pacific species of carnivorous crab which is a member of the family Matutidae. It has been recorded in the eastern Mediterranean since 2010, likely reaching it via the Suez Canal from the Red Sea by Lessepsian migration.

== Description ==
Ashtoret lunaris has a carapace which has a finely grained texture, as well as six tubercles in the middle of the dorsal surface. It also has a linear tubercle along the middle of the posterior of the carapace. The front has straight lobes, with a lateral and slightly emarginated rostrum which is located in the centre and the front lateral margin has five small tubercles followed by three larger deltoid tubercles. The lateral spine is equal in length to a fifth of the carapace width. Chelipeds have a five-lobed ridge in the middle of the palm, the second and fourth lobes of which are pointed with the second lobe being the largest. There is a ridge on the outer surface of the dactylus of males which is finely grained in texture; this is absent in females. The carapace is beige or yellow in background colour and is covered in red dots. The pereiopods have paddle-shaped tips which facilitate a skimming locomotion along the substrate and rapid burrowing into sand. In some specimens the paddles have large, dark blotches and sometimes smaller dark spots on the legs. They grow to 3–8 cm in width.

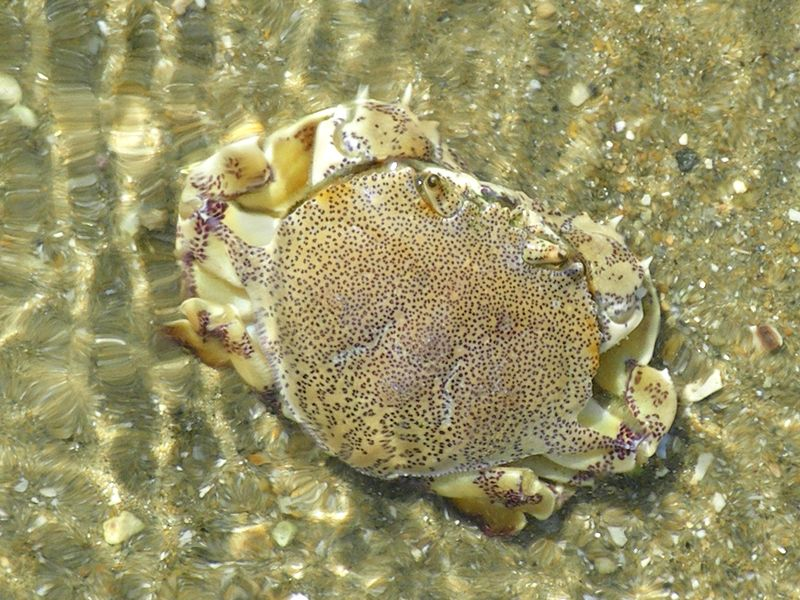
Ashtoret lunaris (Forskål,1775) at Nagasaki Prefecture

== Distribution ==
Ashtoret lunaris has a natural distribution in the Indian Ocean and the Pacific Ocean from the Red Sea and eastern African coast as far south as KwaZulu-Natal east to New Caledonia, south to Australia and north as far as Japan. The first specimen of A. lunaris recorded in the Mediterranean was a single specimen which was collected at a depth of 20m in Haifa Bay by a trawler in 1987. No specimens were recorded in subsequent years and it was assumed that any population had died out. Then, in 2015, four female specimens were caught by a trawler in Iskenderun Bay in south eastern Turkey suggesting that the species had become established in the area. The most likely route of colonisation was from the Red Sea through the Suez Canal and then along the northward current that runs along the Israel-Lebanon-Syria coast towards Iskenderun Bay.

== Biology ==
Ashtoret lunaris is commonly encountered in sandy and muddy shores, especially near seagrass beds from the intertidal zone to a depth of 50m. They are usually nocturnal and spend the day buried in the substrate just below the surface, creating breathing channels to the surface of the sand. They hunt small shellfish, worms and other animals. During the night, they are known to take other crabs. When threatened, A. lunaris often draws its legs up under the overlapping edges of the carapace and appears to sham death; this may make it difficult for a predator to dismember the crab.

== Uses ==
Ashtoret lunaris is fished for food using nets but not in Singapore.

== Name ==
Ashtoret lunaris was described by the Swedish zoologist Peter Forsskål in 1775. The specific name, lunaris refers to the moon. while the generic name Ashtoret refers to the Phoenician moon goddess Ashtoreth.

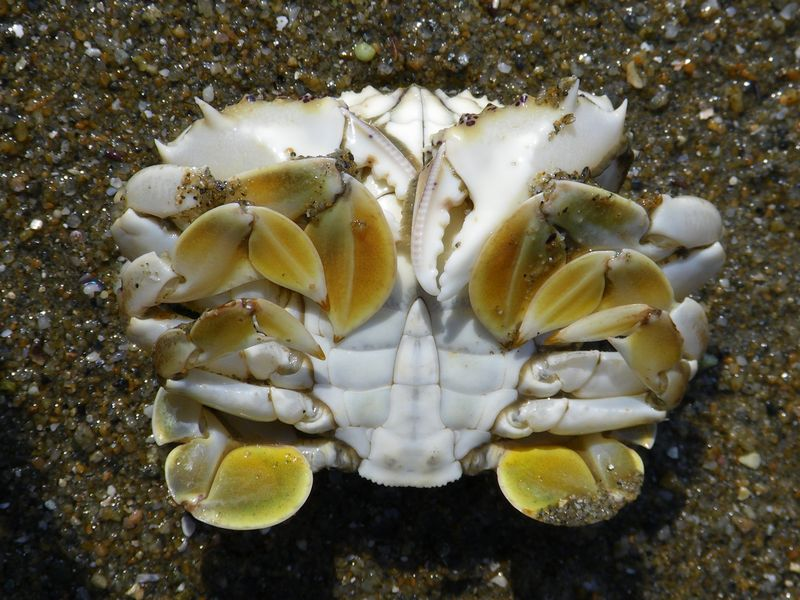
Defensive posture
