= Crab curry =

Indian seafood dish

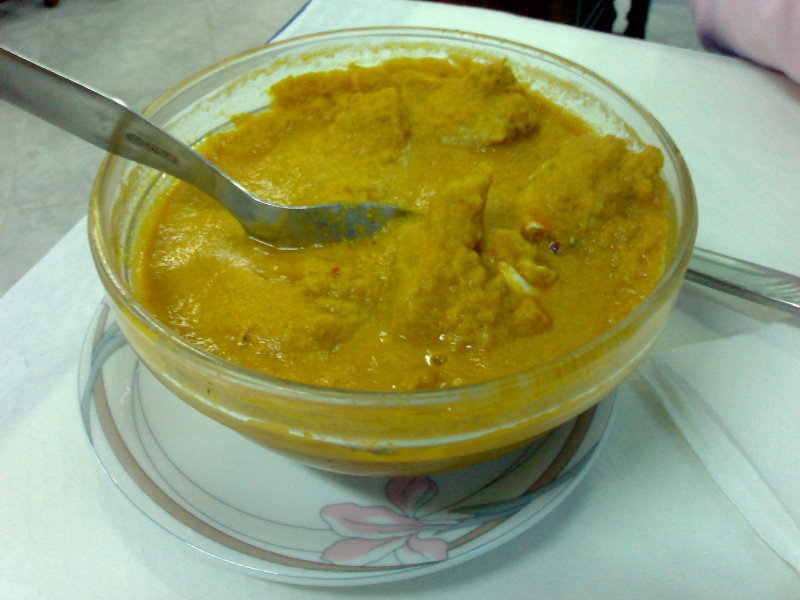
Caril de caranguejo or crab curry.

Crab curry (caril de caranguejo in Portuguese) is a typical Indian seafood dish later incorporated by Portuguese into their cuisine, to make Indo-Portuguese dish variants from Goa, Daman and Diu, a region along the west coast of today's India which was part of the Portuguese State of India (Estado da Índia). It is also a typical dish from Mozambique, due to the significant Goan population there. It is a curry prepared with crab, which traditionally has been found in abundance off the coast of Goa.

In addition to the crab, its ingredients include onion, tomato, piri piri (a cultivar of Capsicum chinense, one of the sources of chili pepper that grows both wild and domesticated), garlic, coconuts and spices which form a yellow curry.

The coconuts are grated, to extract their milk. The crab can be cut into pieces or shredded. The cooked crab is placed in a pan to boil with most of the ingredients. After some time the coconut milk is added, boiling the dish for about 30 minutes to rinse it.

It is usually served with white rice, which can be complemented with pickle and papadums.

The cook Jamie Oliver's version uses chilies, onion, garlic, ginger, cumin, cardamom, mustard seed, fennel seed, lemon juice, and coconut milk to flavour the crab meat. It can be cooked in 35 minutes.
