= Dressed crab =

British traditional seafood dish

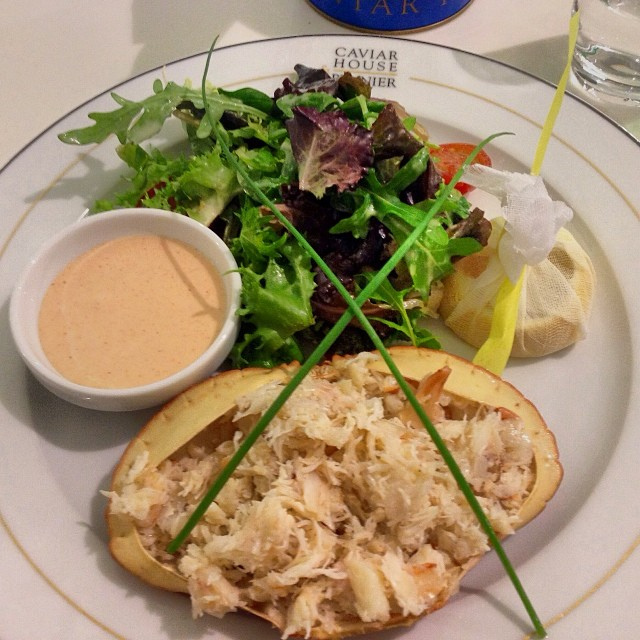
- Dressed crab with salad and Marie Rose sauce
- Type: Seafood
- Place of origin: United Kingdom
- Serving temperature: cold
- Main ingredients: Crab meat, Marie Rose sauce, bread, and lemon juice

Dressed crab is a traditional seafood dish in British cuisine made of the meat of an edible or brown crab served in its own shell. A mixture of white and brown meat is used, often arranged in an artistic style. If the claws are included, these may be cracked by the diner or the meat from the claws may be included whole.

The crab meat is normally served with Marie Rose sauce- or occasionally mayonnaise or tartar sauce- brown bread, salad, and lemon slices. Variations may be seasoned with Cayenne pepper, parsley, or breadcrumbs. A more substantial meal can be made by adding chips. A simpler variation is the crab meat removed from the shell and as a filling for a sandwich with similar accompaniments.

The meal is associated with English coastal counties, and there are notable crab fisheries at Cromer, Newlyn, and Mersea Island. A significant amount of crab is also caught around Pembrokeshire and Anglesey in Wales and all around the coast of Scotland, and dressed crab is usually available in these regions.

Both on the coast and further inland, a simpler form of dressed crab is available from seafood stalls, part of a cuisine that includes mussels, whelks, jellied eels, cockles and shrimp. This version is usually sold with salt, pepper, and malt vinegar.

While commercial crab fisheries in the UK date back centuries, and subsistence catching dates back to prehistoric times, the specific combination with Marie Rose sauce originated in the 1960s; around the same time as another "new traditional" cold meal, the Ploughmans lunch.

== See also ==
- Ploughman's lunch
- Fish and chips
