= Crab =

Group of crustaceans

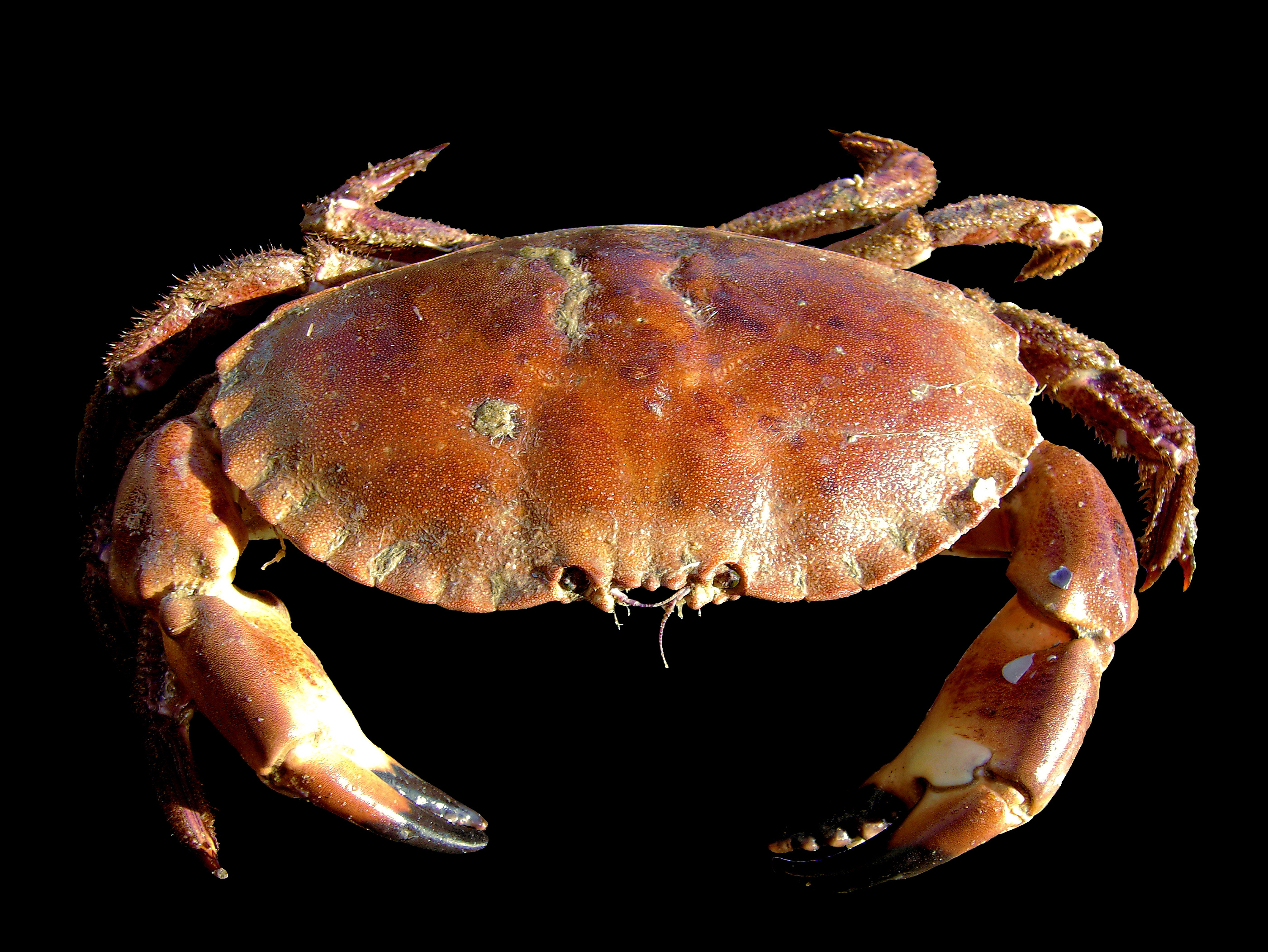
Cancer pagurus, the edible or brown crab (Brachyura)

Crabs are decapod crustaceans, either the Brachyura (the "true crabs") or various groups within the closely related Anomura (hermit crabs, porcelain crabs etc), characterised by having a heavily armoured shell, their tail segments concealed under the body, the ability to run sideways, and the habit of hiding in rocky crevices. They do not form a single natural group or clade, but have convergently evolved multiple times from the ancestral decapod body plan through carcinisation, the process of creating this set of characteristics. As a group, they are thus polyphyletic, meaning they have multiple evolutionary origins.

Crabs vary in size from the pea crab, a few millimeters wide, to the Japanese spider crab, with a leg span up to 4 m (13 ft). Many crabs are free-living marine omnivores; others are specialist herbivores or carnivores, while some are parasitic. A substantial number of species are adapted to freshwater or other non-marine habitats.

Crabs make up about 20% of the marine crustaceans that are caught or farmed for human consumption. In British cuisine, dressed crab is a traditional seafood meal, while in Goa and Mozambique, crab curry is a typical dish. Crabs feature in Greek and Malay mythology, and as the astrological sign Cancer. They have appeared in art in media including pottery, paintings, blouse panels, and book illustrations. Hermit crabs are often kept in aquariums and as pets. A popular meme jokes that everything will evolve into crabs, based inaccurately on the genuine evolutionary trend within the decapods.

== Diversity ==
=== Taxonomic range ===
==== Phylogeny ====
Crabs are not a single taxonomic group. Instead, alongside the Brachyura or true crabs, are multiple groups of the Anomura that are called crabs, including the hermit crabs, mole crabs, king crabs, and porcelain crabs. A distantly-related group of arthropods, the horseshoe crabs, with an armoured carapace but a quite different body plan, is a member of the Chelicerata, the group that includes the spiders and scorpions. The crab body form and associated behaviour have arisen independently at different times in multiple groups of decapod crustaceans (boldface in tree).

- Arthropoda
  - Chelicerata Middle Cambrian
    - Xiphosura Late Ordovician
      (**horseshoe crabs**)
    - other chelicerates (spiders, scorpions)
  - Mandibulata
    - other crustaceans
    - Decapoda
      - other decapods (prawns, shrimps, lobsters)
      - - Brachyura Early Jurassic
          (**"true" crabs**)
        - Anomura Late Triassic
          - - Porcellanidae Late Jurassic
              (**porcelain crabs**)
            - Munididae (squat lobsters)
          - - - Parapaguridae (deep water sea anemone hermit crabs)
              - - Lomisidae (**hairy stone crabs**)
                - Aeglidae
            - - Hippidae (mole crabs or sand crabs)
              - Paguroidea Late Cretaceous
                - Lithodidae Late Cenozoic
                  (**king crabs**)
                - Paguridae
                  - Birgus latro (**coconut crab**)
                  - **Patagurus rex**
                  - (other hermit crabs)

==== Specific groups ====
===== Chelicerata =====
Horseshoe crabs (Xiphosura) are an ancient group within the Chelicerata, known from the late Ordovician of Canada, around 445 million years ago. Their bodies are divided into an anterior prosoma (fused head and thorax) and a posterior opisthosoma, or abdomen. The upper surface of the prosoma is covered by a semicircular carapace (top part of the shell), while the underside bears five pairs of walking legs and a pair of pincer-like chelicerae. The mouth is on the underside of the prosoma, between the bases of the walking legs.

===== Decapoda =====
Crab-like decapods span multiple groups:

- True crabs (Brachyura) are generally covered with a thick exoskeleton (jointed shell), composed primarily of highly mineralized chitin. Males often have larger claws than females.
- Porcelain crabs (Porcellanidae) are small flattened decapods that hide under rocks. They often shed limbs to escape predators.
- The hairy stone crab (Lomisidae) is a slow-moving crab of the Australian shore. It is camouflaged with brown hair.
- Hermit crabs (Paguroidea) have heavily armoured crab-like claws, but in place of a carapace, they inhabit empty scavenged gastropod mollusc shells to protect their fragile bodies.
- King crabs (Lithodidae) live mainly in cold deep water. They resemble brachyurans but are more closely related to hermit crabs.
- The coconut crab (Birgus) is a large terrestrial hermit crab of islands in the Pacific and Indian oceans.
- Patagurus rex is a specialised hermit crab from Polynesia, living at a depth of 400 metres. Its carapace is unique but enough to make it look crab-like.

=== Size and shape ===
Crabs vary in size from the pea crab, a few millimeters wide, to the Japanese spider crab, with a leg span up to 4 m (13 ft). The coconut crab is the largest terrestrial arthropod, and indeed the largest extant terrestrial invertebrate, at up to 40 cm (16 in) long and weighing up to 4.1 kg (9 lb).

Smallest and largest

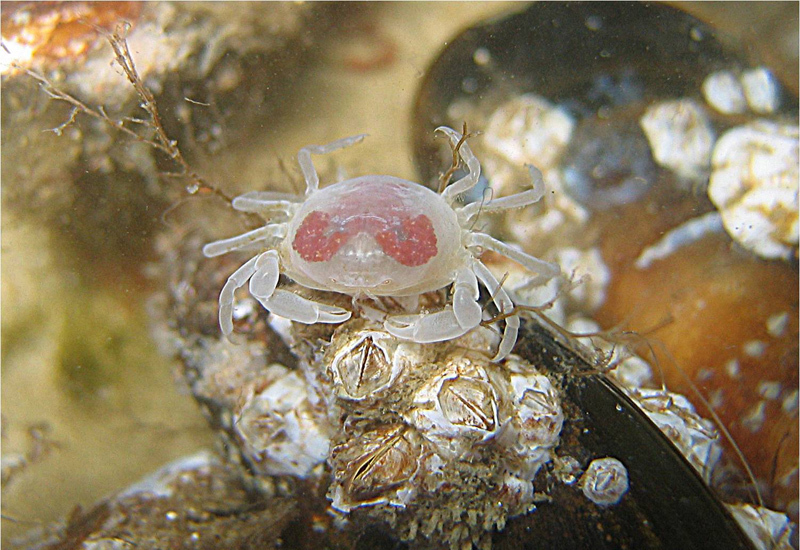
Adult pea crab, one of the smallest species, a few millimetres across

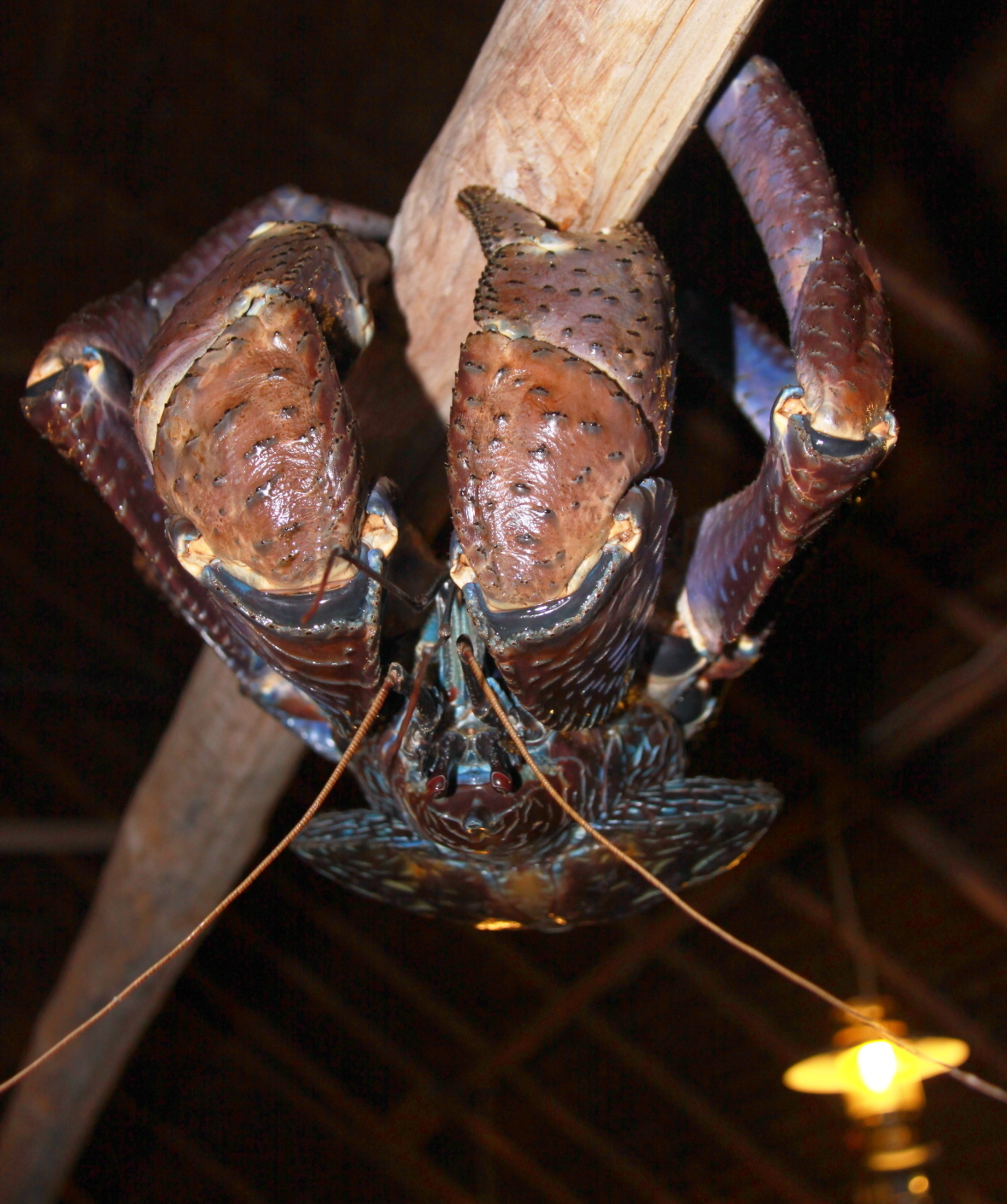
Coconut crab, the largest terrestrial arthropod, weighing up to 4.1 kg (9 lb)

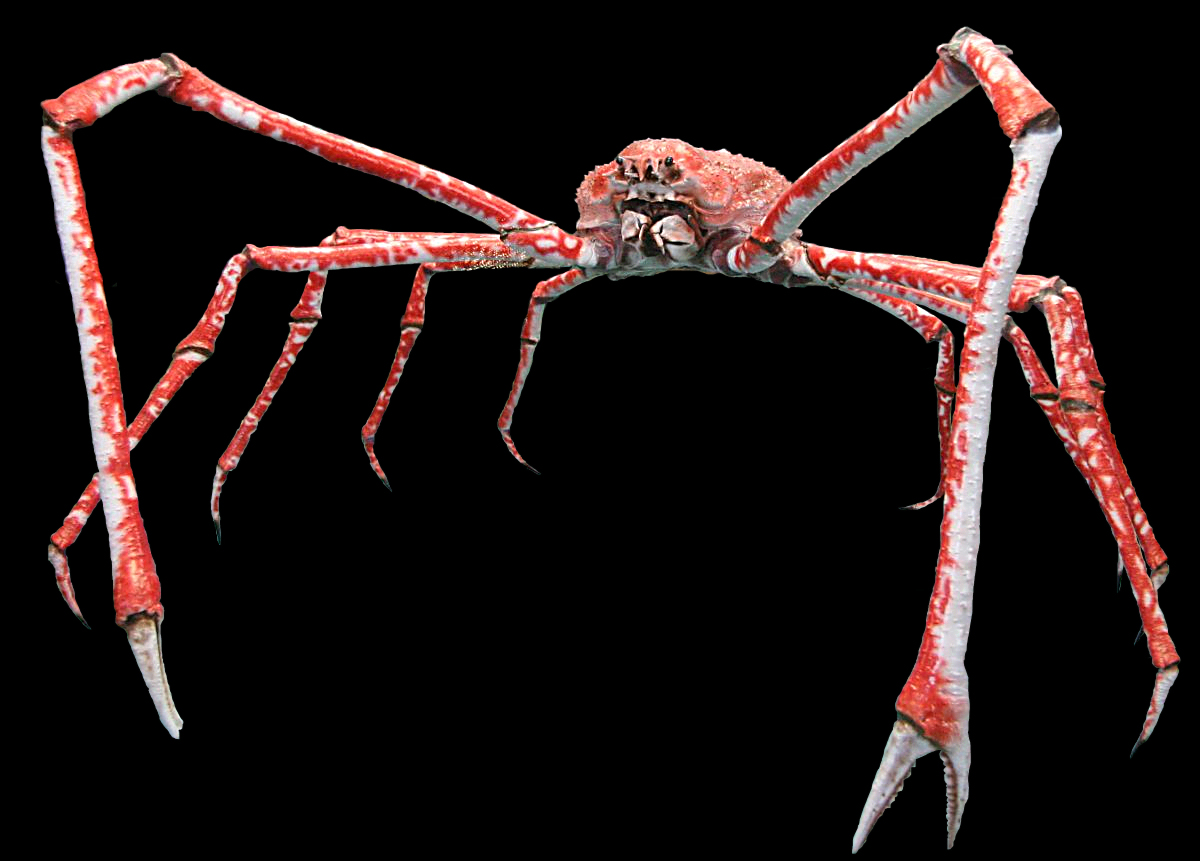
Japanese spider crab, with a leg span of as much as 4 m (13 ft)

=== Feeding methods ===
Many crabs are free-living marine omnivores, feeding on a mixture of algae, small animals such as molluscs, polychaete worms, other crustaceans, and detritus. Others are more specialised: the mottled crab Grapsus albolineatus, for example, is herbivorous, feeding mainly on algae and preferring the more nutritious filamentous algae to leafy (foliose) algae, while the yellow moon crab Ashtoret lunaris is carnivorous. The porcelain crabs are plankton feeders, filtering their prey from seawater using long feathery bristles on their mouthparts. The tiny soft-bodied oyster crab is a kleptoparasite of oysters, living inside the host's shell and eating its food.

Diverse feeding methods

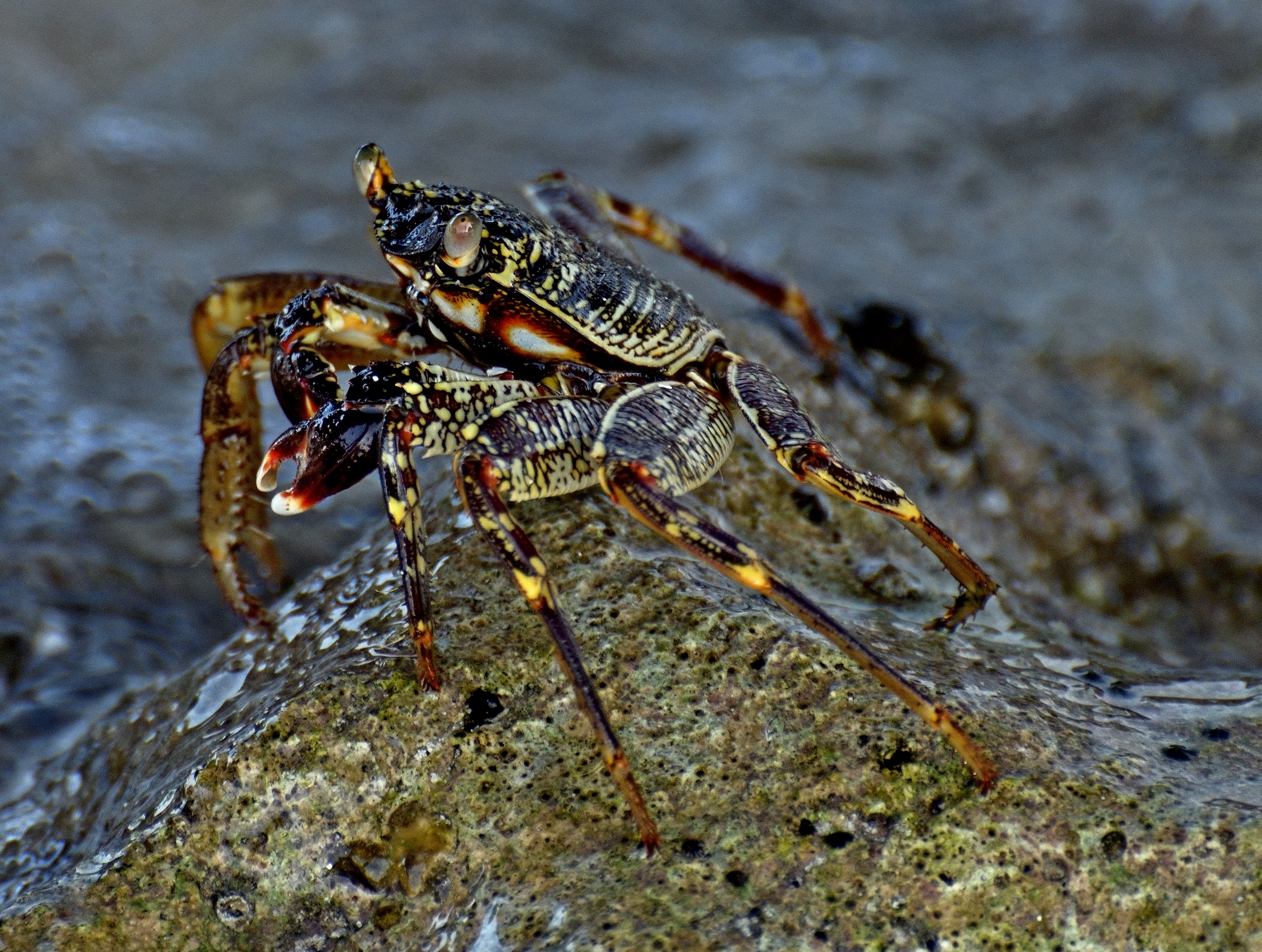
The mottled lightfoot crab is herbivorous.

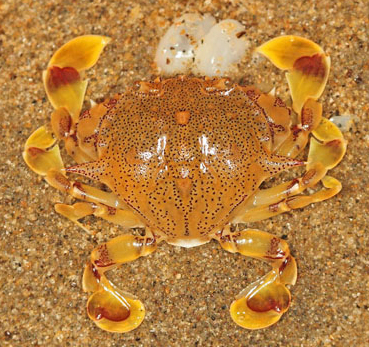
The yellow moon crab is carnivorous.

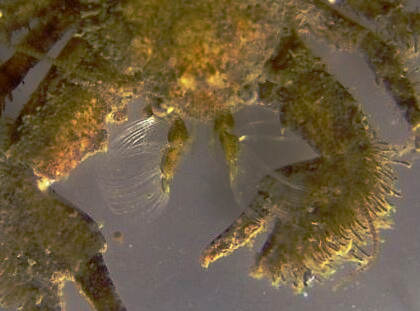
Porcelain crabs are filter feeders, using feathery bristles on their mouthparts.

=== Ecological niches ===
The tufted ghost crab Ocypode cursor is semi-terrestrial, consuming terrestrial animals such as insects. Other species, including the pea crabs (Pinnotheridae), are parasitic, living inside hosts such as bivalve molluscs. The tree crab or Caribbean hermit crab is terrestrial as an adult, only returning to the ocean to spawn. It feeds on plants and by scavenging, and like other hermit crabs, takes over a mollusc shell for protection, breathing air with a lung. Some 1,300 species of crabs in 8 families are adapted to freshwater. Christmas Island red crabs make an annual mass migration to the sea to lay their eggs.

Diverse ecological niches

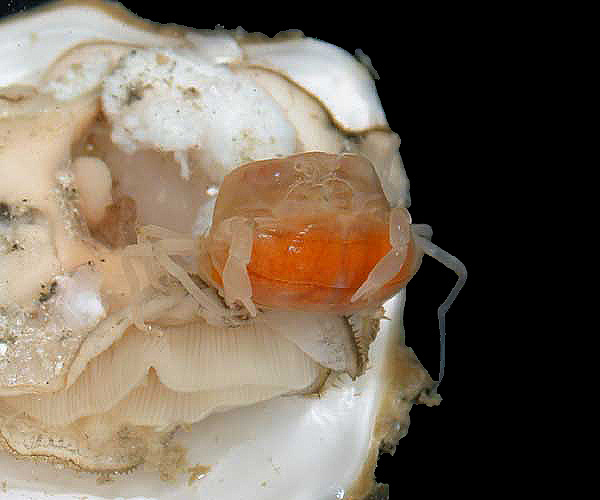
The oyster crab
(centre, orange-coloured) is a kleptoparasite of oysters.

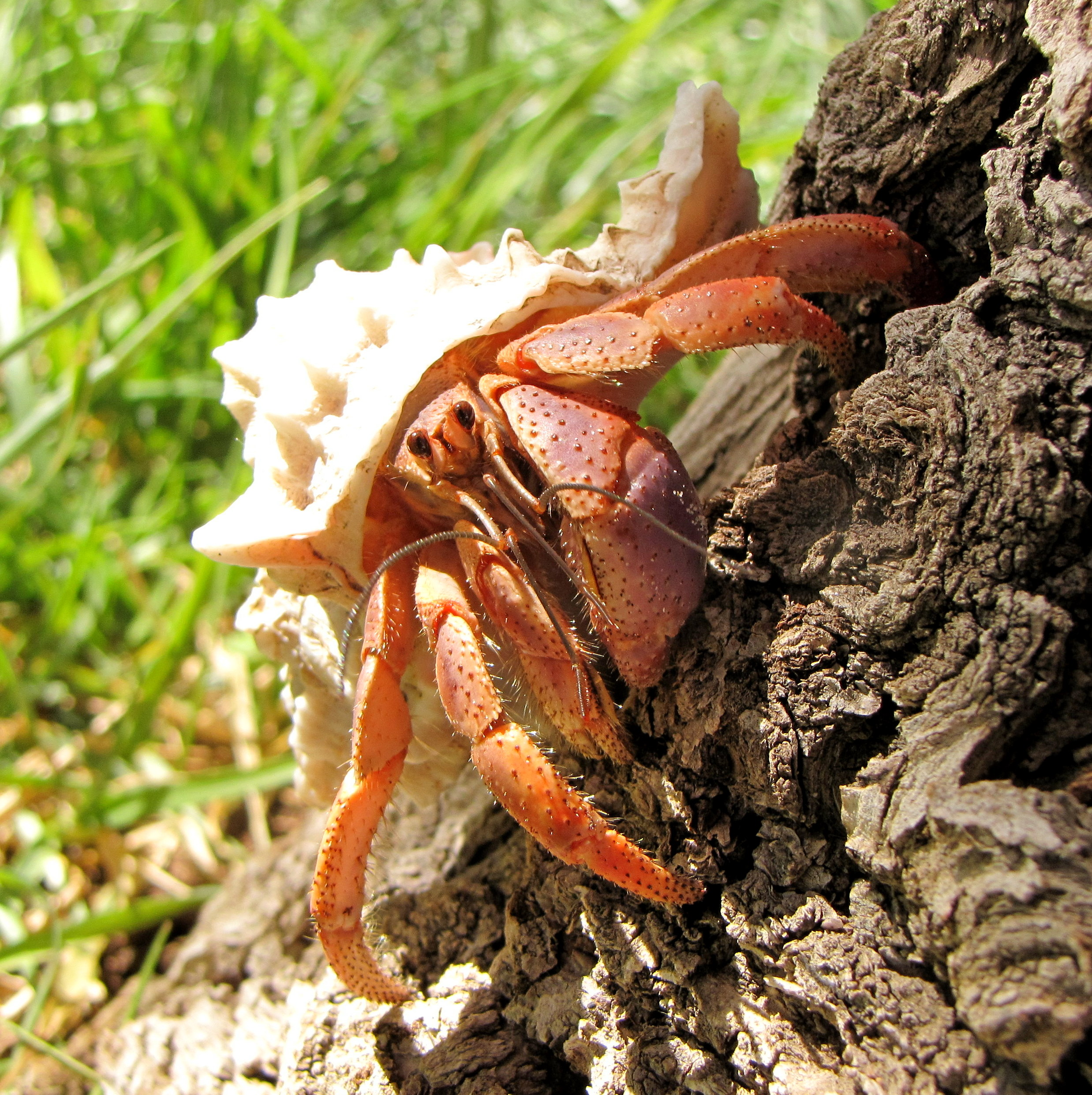
The Caribbean hermit crab is mainly terrestrial.

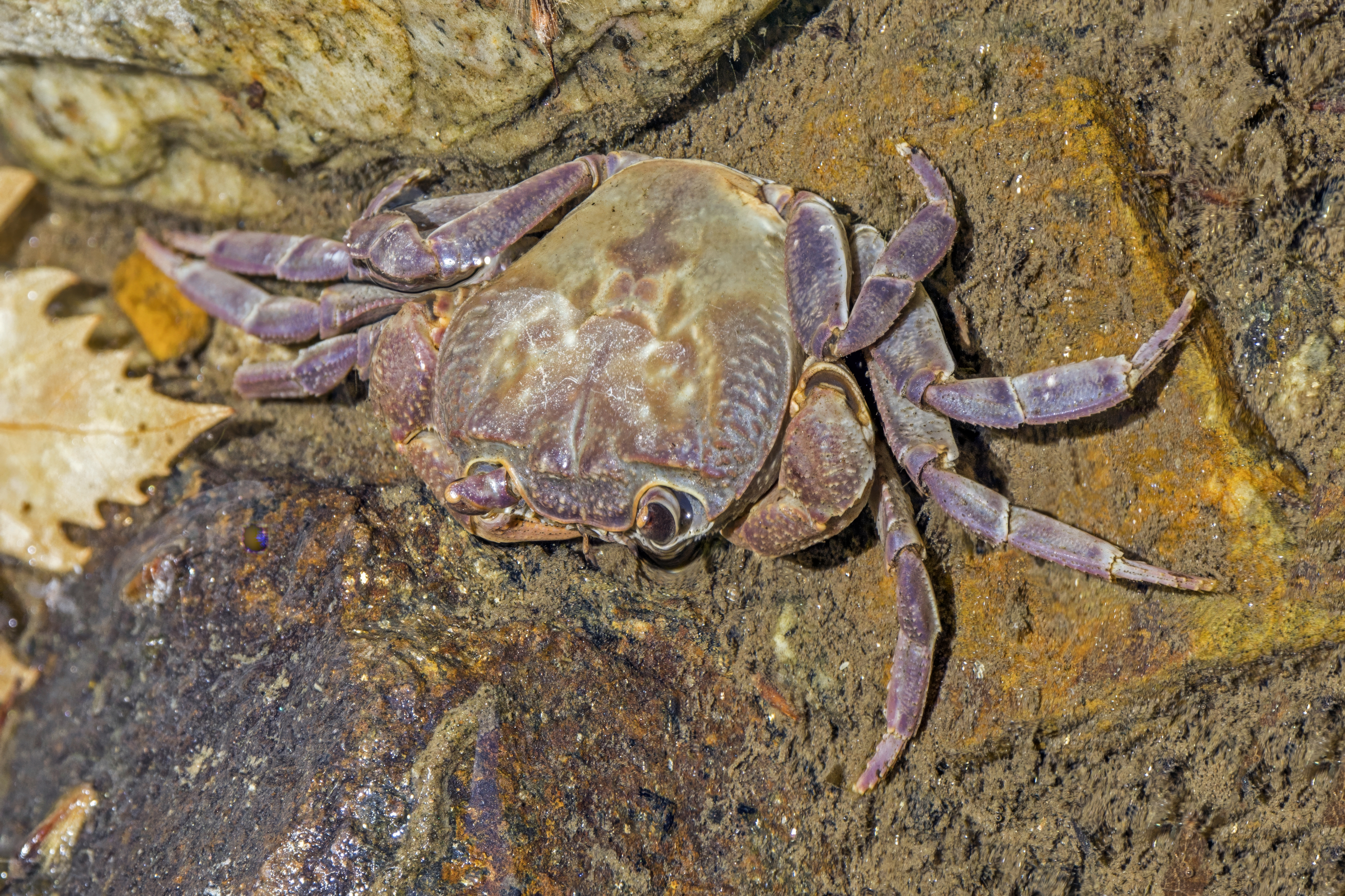
Among many species of freshwater crab, Potamon potamios lives in or near rivers.

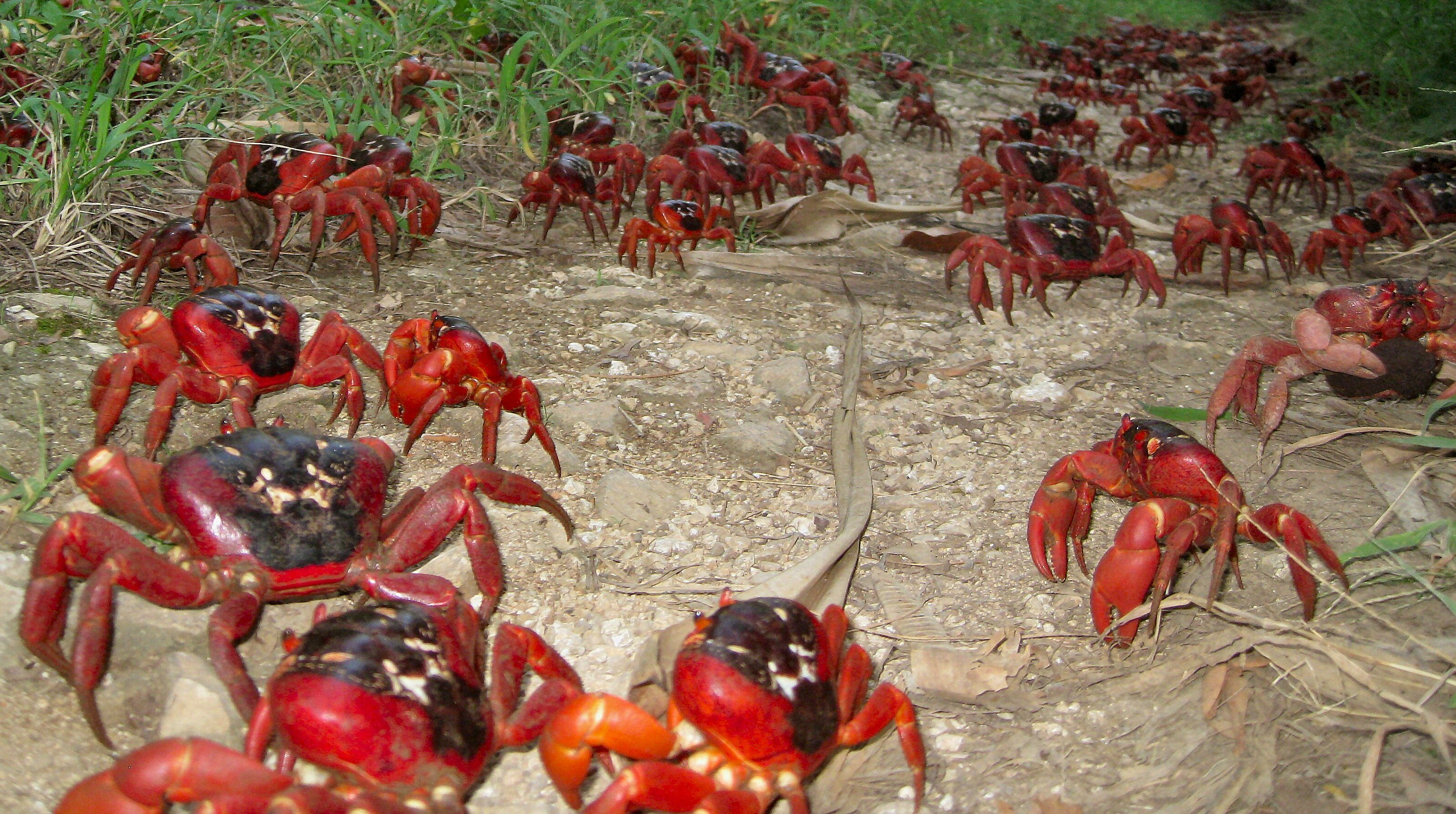
Christmas Island red crabs on their annual migration to the sea

== Similarity of body plan through carcinisation ==
Most crabs are members of the Brachyura, sometimes called "true crabs", with around 7,000 species. Several other groups of decapod crustaceans among the Anomura, such as king crabs and porcelain crabs, have a similar appearance; all have convergently evolved through the process of carcinisation to the crab body form and way of life. Crabs are thus not a single taxonomic group or clade, but are polyphyletic. Many crabs can run swiftly sideways ("crabwise"), though others walk forwards, and some can swim.

The carcinised body form is defined by Keiler and colleagues (2014) as having the following attributes:

- "The carapace is flatter than it is broad and possesses lateral margins."
- "The sternites are fused into a wide sternal plastron which possesses a distinct emargination on its posterior margin."
- "The pleon is flattened and strongly bent, in dorsal view completely hiding the tergites of the fourth pleonal segment, and partially or completely covers the plastron."

Crab body plan, its adaptations illustrated by comparison with a lobster (undersides shown)

== Interactions with humans ==
=== Fisheries and food ===
Crabs make up some 20% of all marine crustaceans caught, farmed, and consumed worldwide, amounting to 1.5 million tonnes annually. One species, the Asian blue crab Portunus trituberculatus, accounts for one-fifth of that total. Other commercially important taxa include Portunus pelagicus, several species in the genus Chionoecetes, the blue crab (Callinectes sapidus), Charybdis spp., Cancer pagurus, the Dungeness crab (Metacarcinus magister), and Scylla serrata, each of which yields more than 20,000 tonnes annually.

Crab fisheries

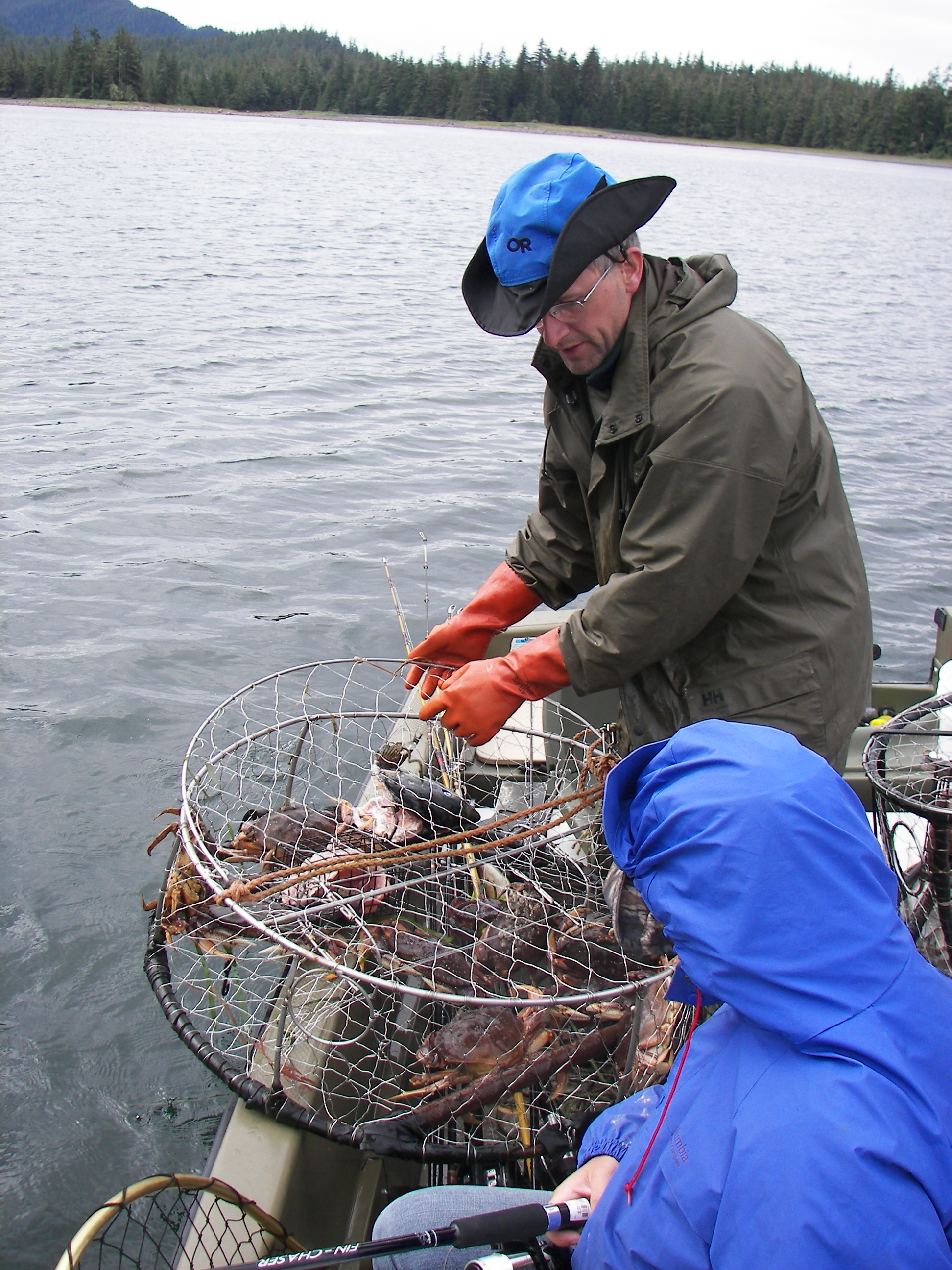
Small-scale crab fishing

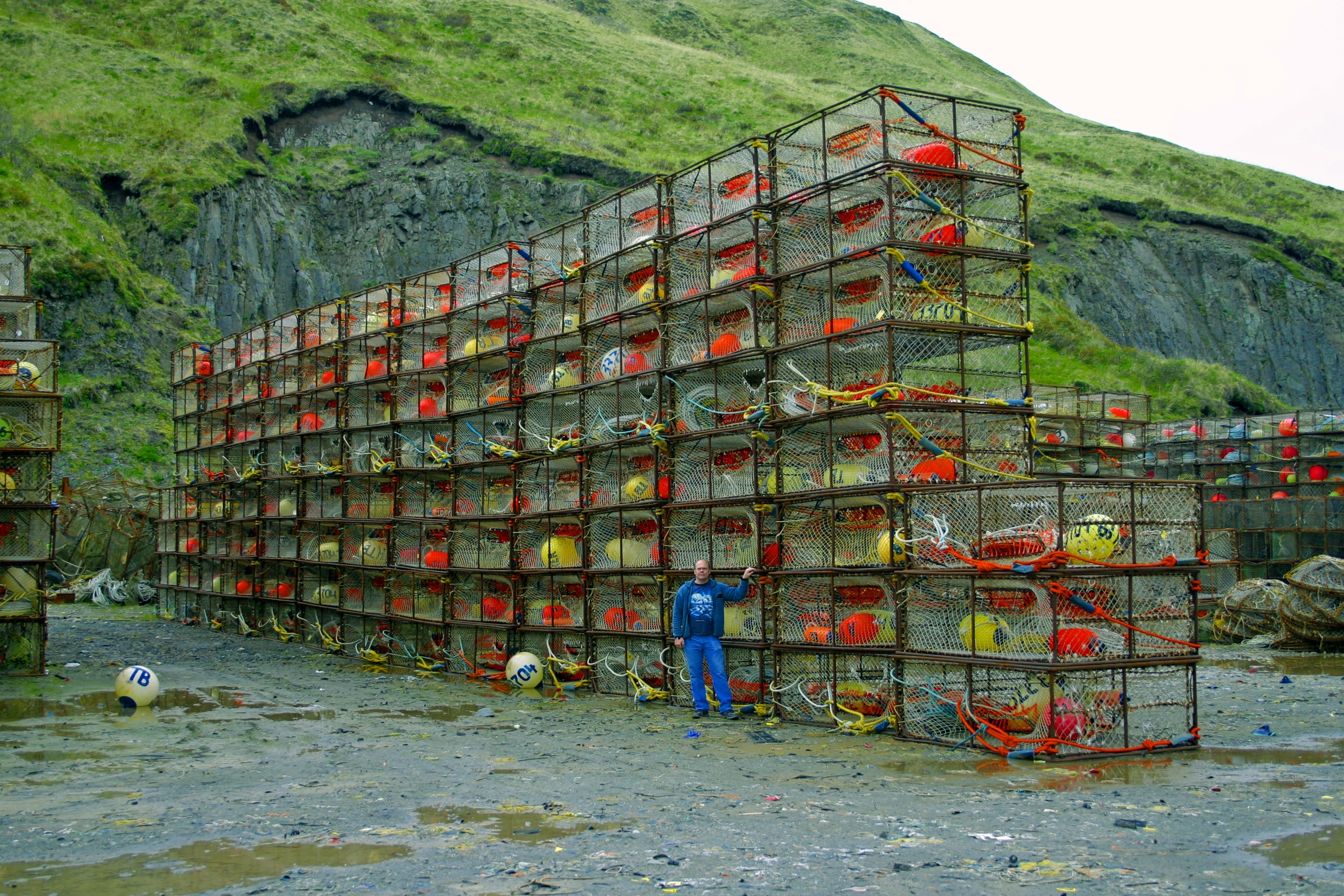
Commercial king crab traps, awaiting the crabbing season

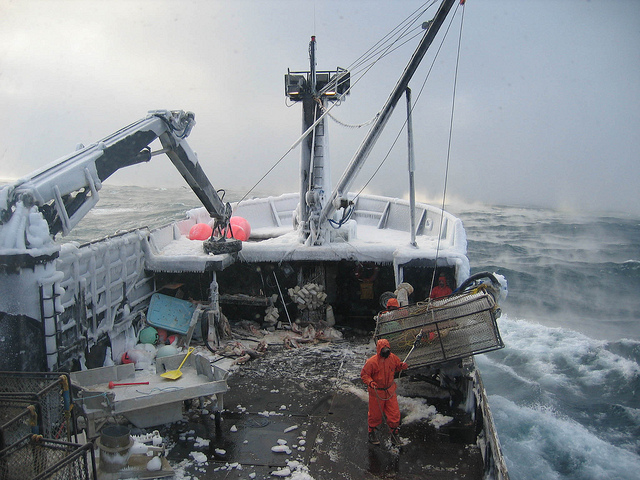
Crab boat in the Bering Sea

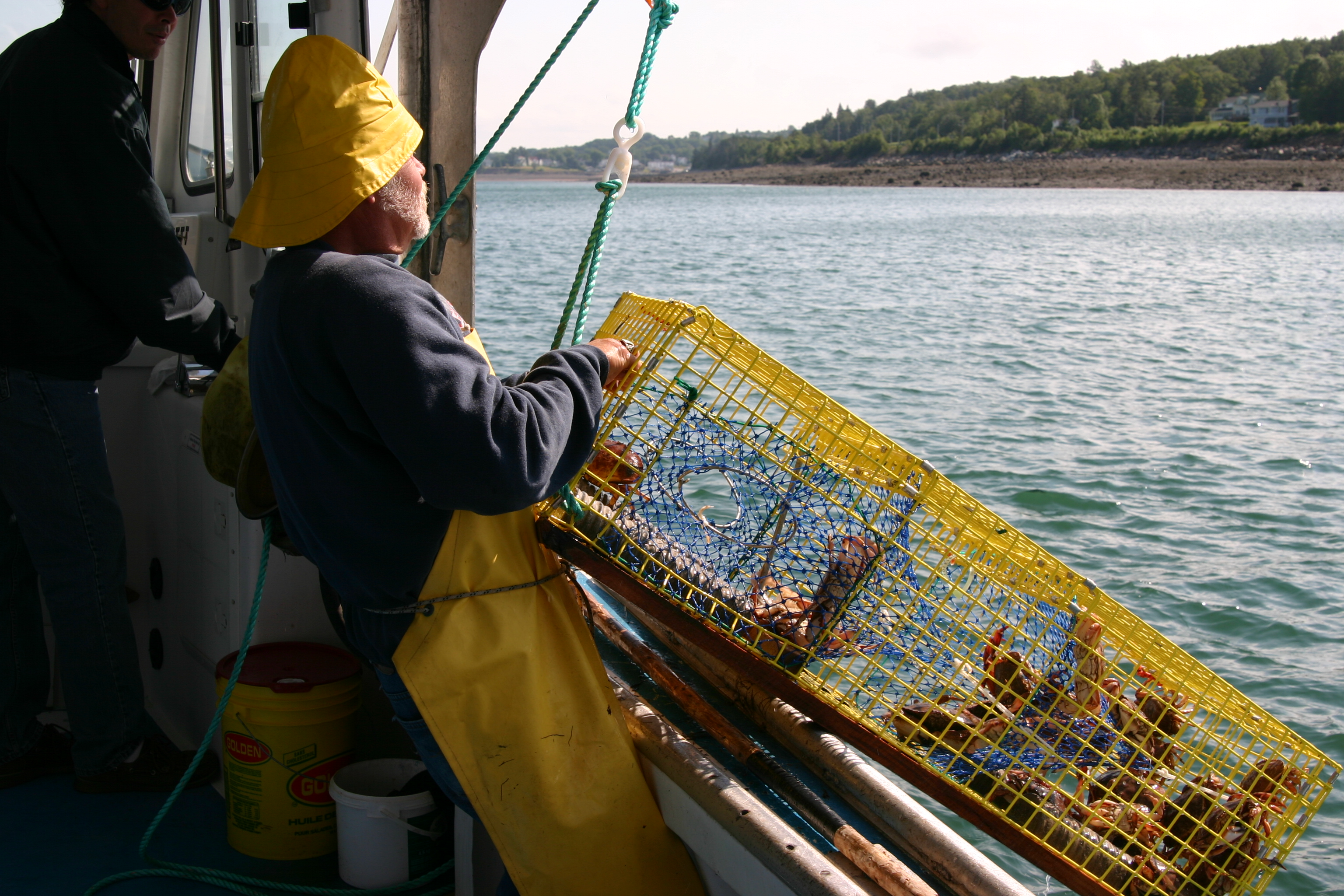
Hauling in a crab trap

In Western Europe, much of the crab meat is from the brown crab Cancer pagurus, noted for its sweet, delicate flavour. The United Kingdom hosts significant fisheries of this species, with major operations in Scotland and the South West of England. Dressed crab is a traditional seafood meal in British cuisine made of the meat of the brown crab served in its own shell.

In North America, there are commercial fisheries for the blue crab Callinectes sapidus along the Atlantic coast of the United States, and in the Gulf of Mexico. The fishery was centered on the Chesapeake Bay, but other places are increasing in importance. Crab cakes are traditionally made from Chesapeake Bay crabs.

In Goa and Mozambique, crab curry is a typical dish, flavoured with chilis, garlic, coconut, and spices.

In Ishikawa prefecture, Japan, both the meat and the eggs of the snow crab are served as sushi in wintertime. The male is known as kano-gani, the female as kobako-gani. The short fishing season for the females makes kobako-gani sushi a rare delicacy.

Dishes made with crab

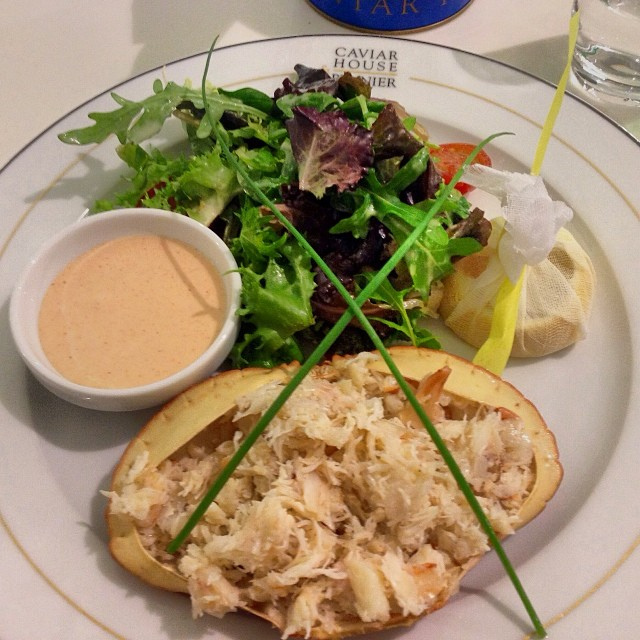
Dressed crab with salad
and Marie Rose sauce

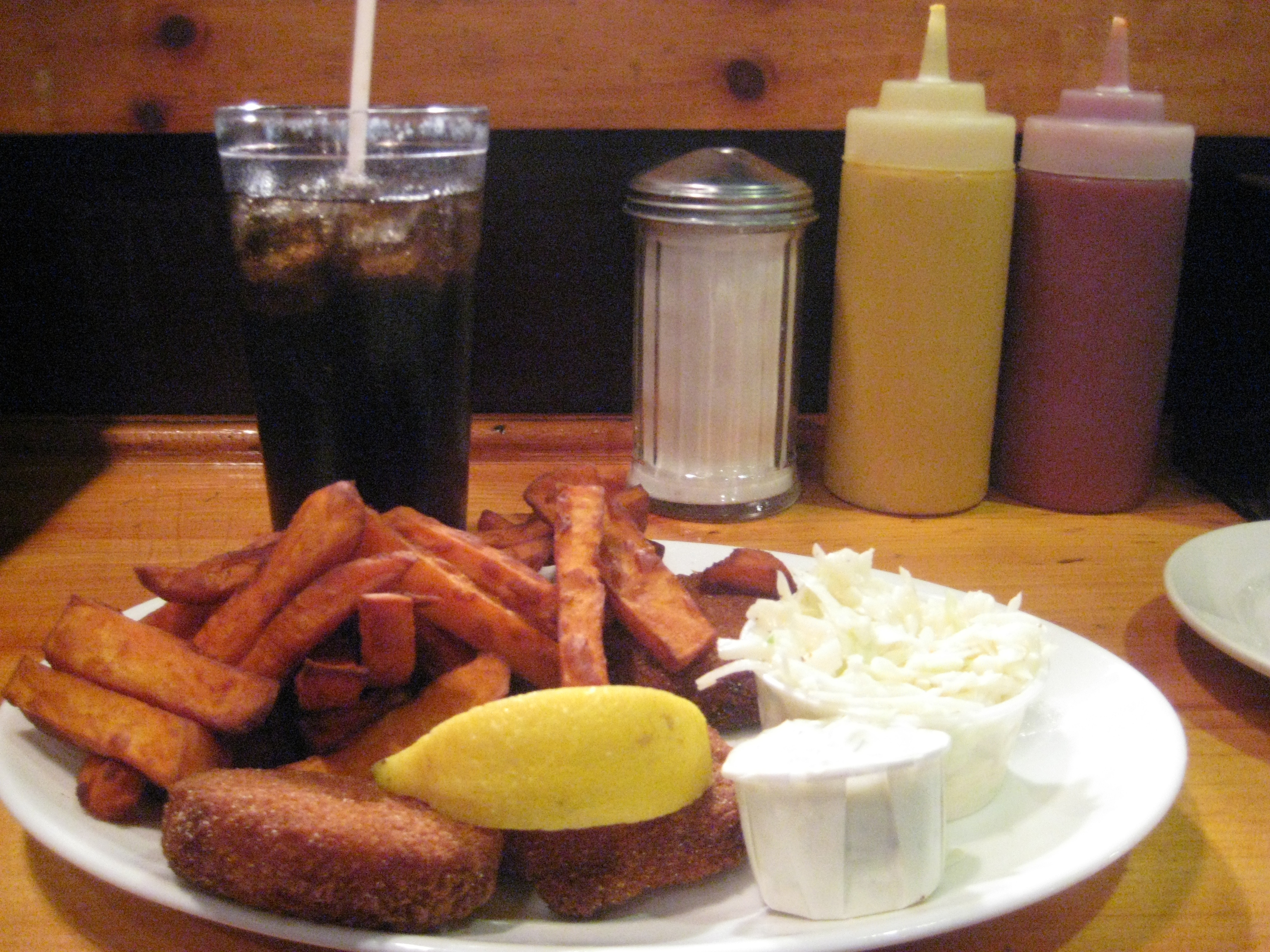
Crab cakes with sweet potato fries, coleslaw, and tartar sauce

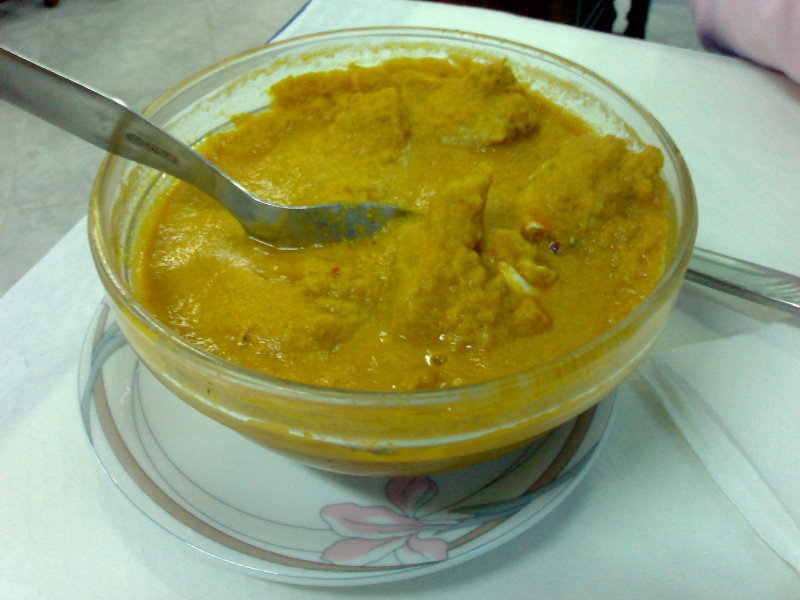
Goan style crab curry

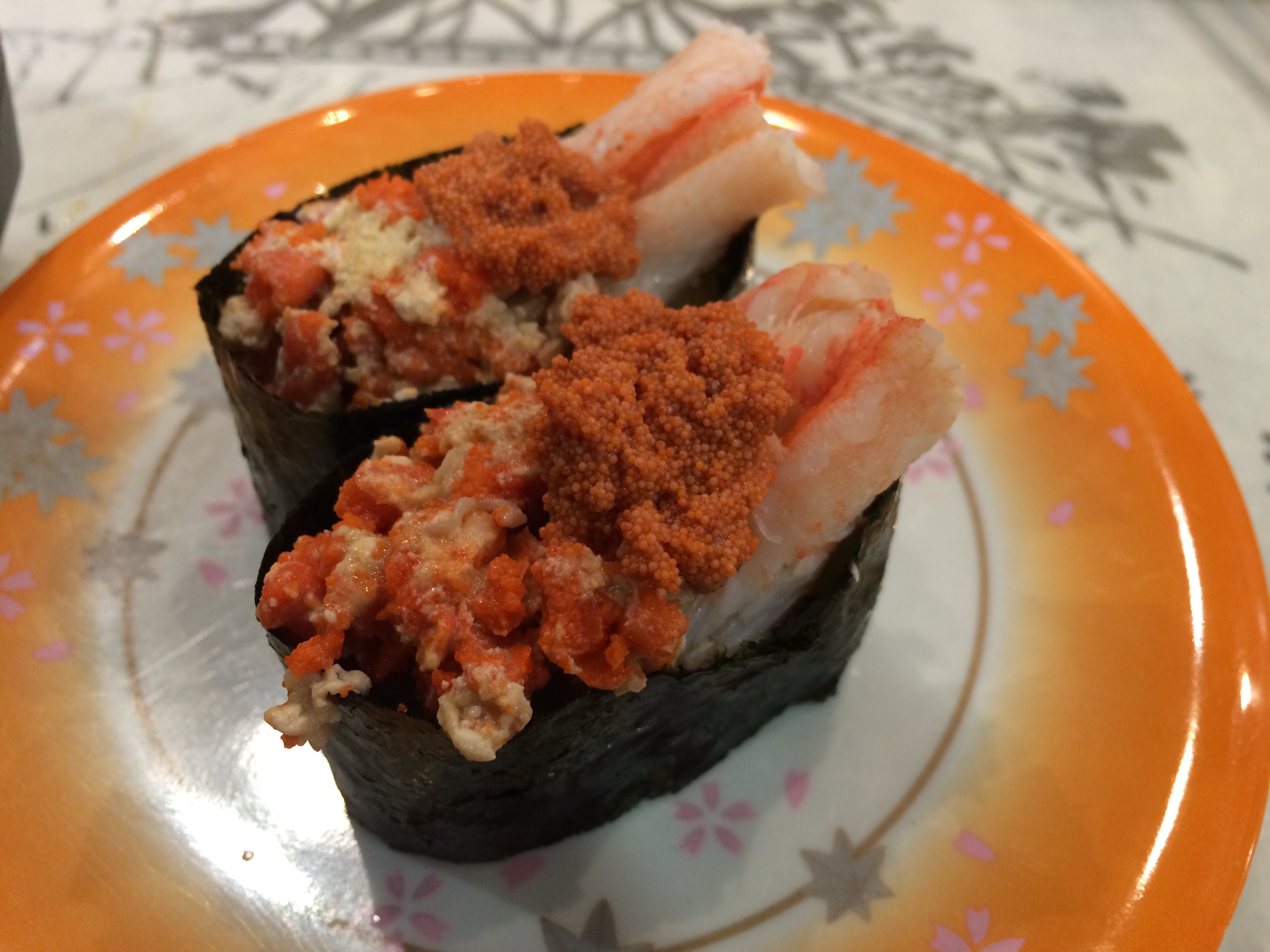
Kobako-gani sushi with snow crab meat and eggs

=== In culture ===
Both the constellation Cancer and the astrological sign Cancer are named after the crab, and depicted as such. In Greek mythology, Karkinos was a crab that came to the aid of the Lernaean Hydra as it battled the hero Heracles. The crab is at best a secondary character in the myth, and sometimes omitted altogether. This has been explained by the suggestion that it was introduced into the myth by Mesopotamian influence, as astrologers tried to associate the Labours of Hercules with the twelve signs of the Zodiac.

Mythology and astrology

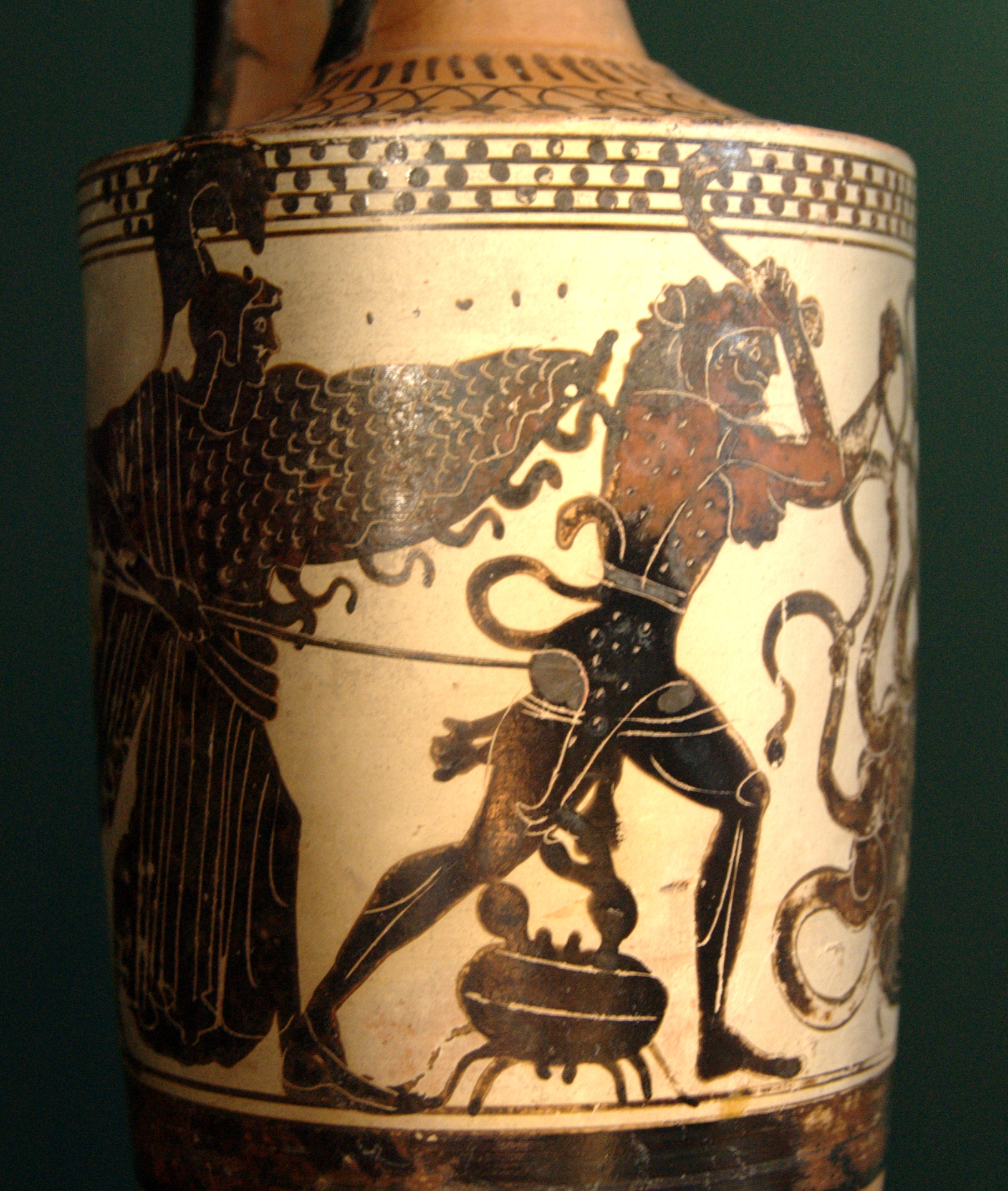
The crab Karkinos attacking Herakles as he fights the Lernaean Hydra. Attic lekythos pot, "the Diosphos Painter",
500–475 BC

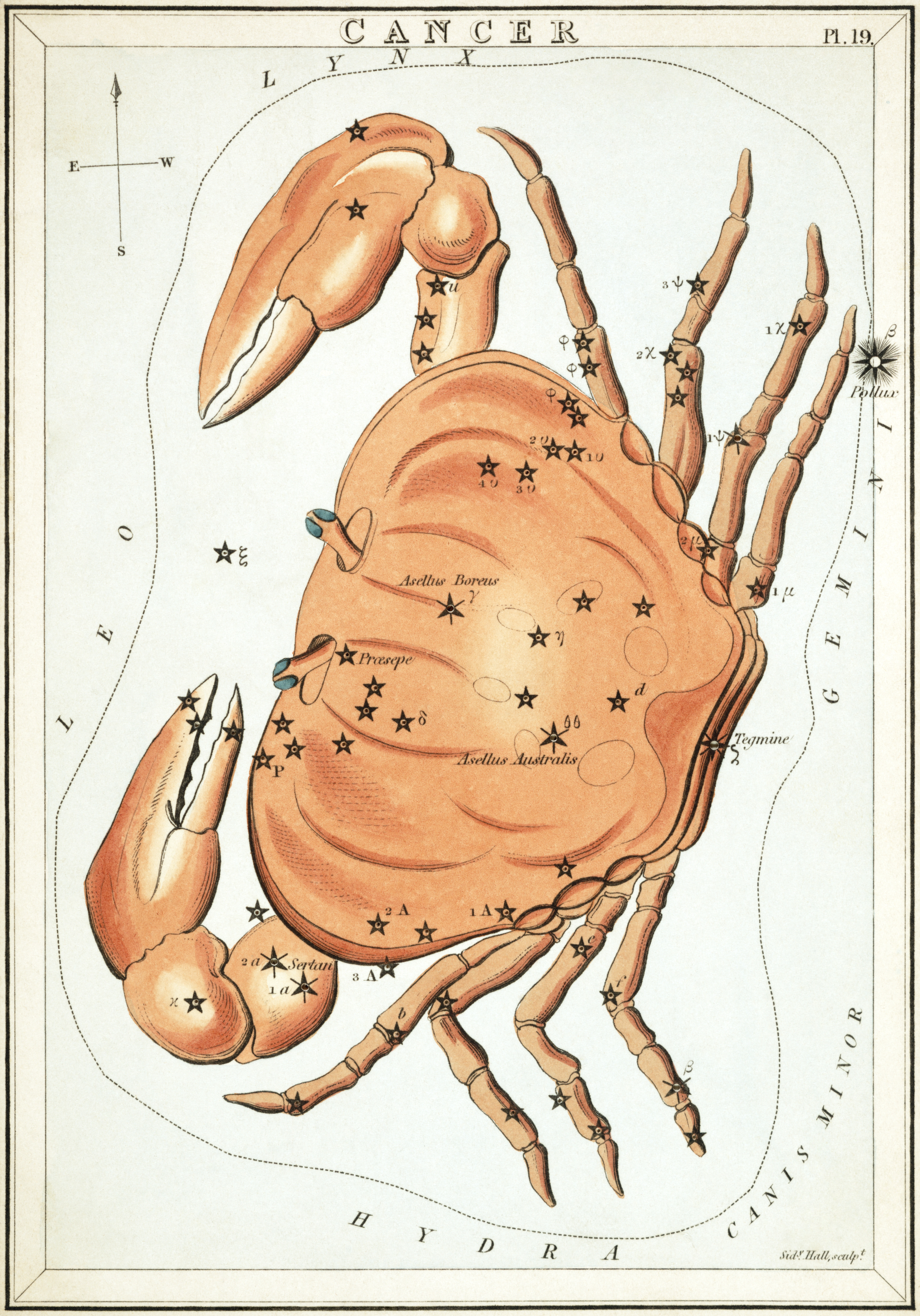
The constellation of Cancer, the crab, from Urania's Mirror,
c. 1825

Crabs have appeared in art since ancient times in many different media. The Moche people of ancient Peru worshipped nature, especially the sea, and often depicted crabs in their art. Among the many later representations, the German artist Albrecht Dürer made a meticulous painting of the crab Eriphia verrucosa in 1495; since the species lives on the Adriatic coast, he likely painted the animal when he visited Venice. Quite a different artistic portrayal is the monumental crab table setting charger created by the Barbizet Studio that made glazed earthenware pottery between 1850 and 1890. In China, Gao Qipei (1672–1734) painted Crabs and Chrysanthemums in ink and light watercolour on paper. In Panama, the Guna people of the San Blas Islands make Mola appliqué blouse panels decorated with motifs such as crabs from the waters of the Caribbean.

In different media through the centuries

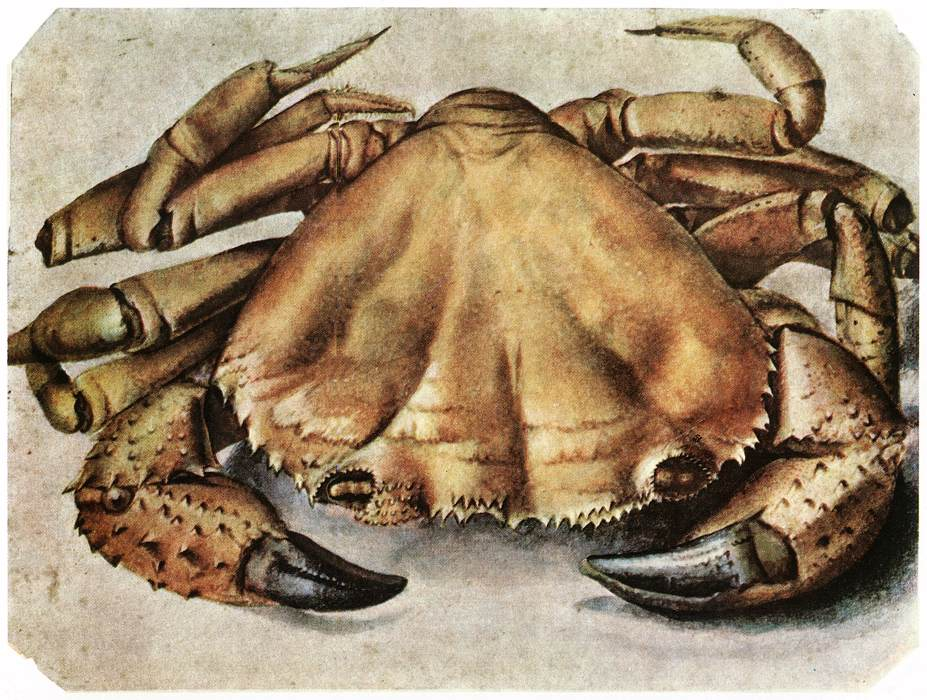
Crab by Albrecht Dürer, gouache and watercolour on paper, Germany, 1495

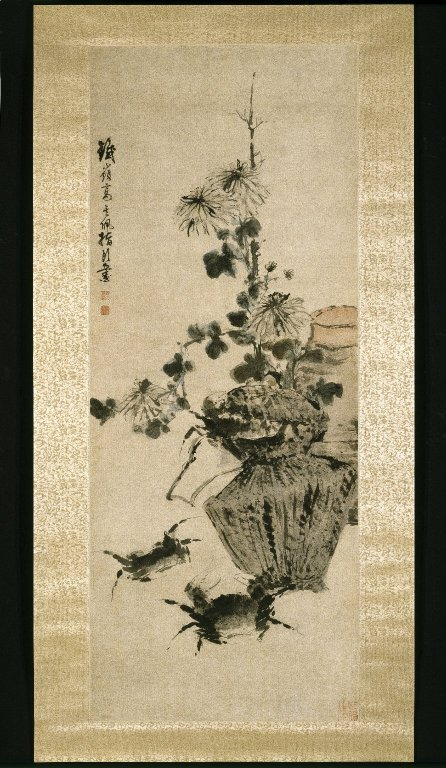
Crabs and Chrysanthemums, Gao Qipei, ink and light colour on paper, China, 18th century

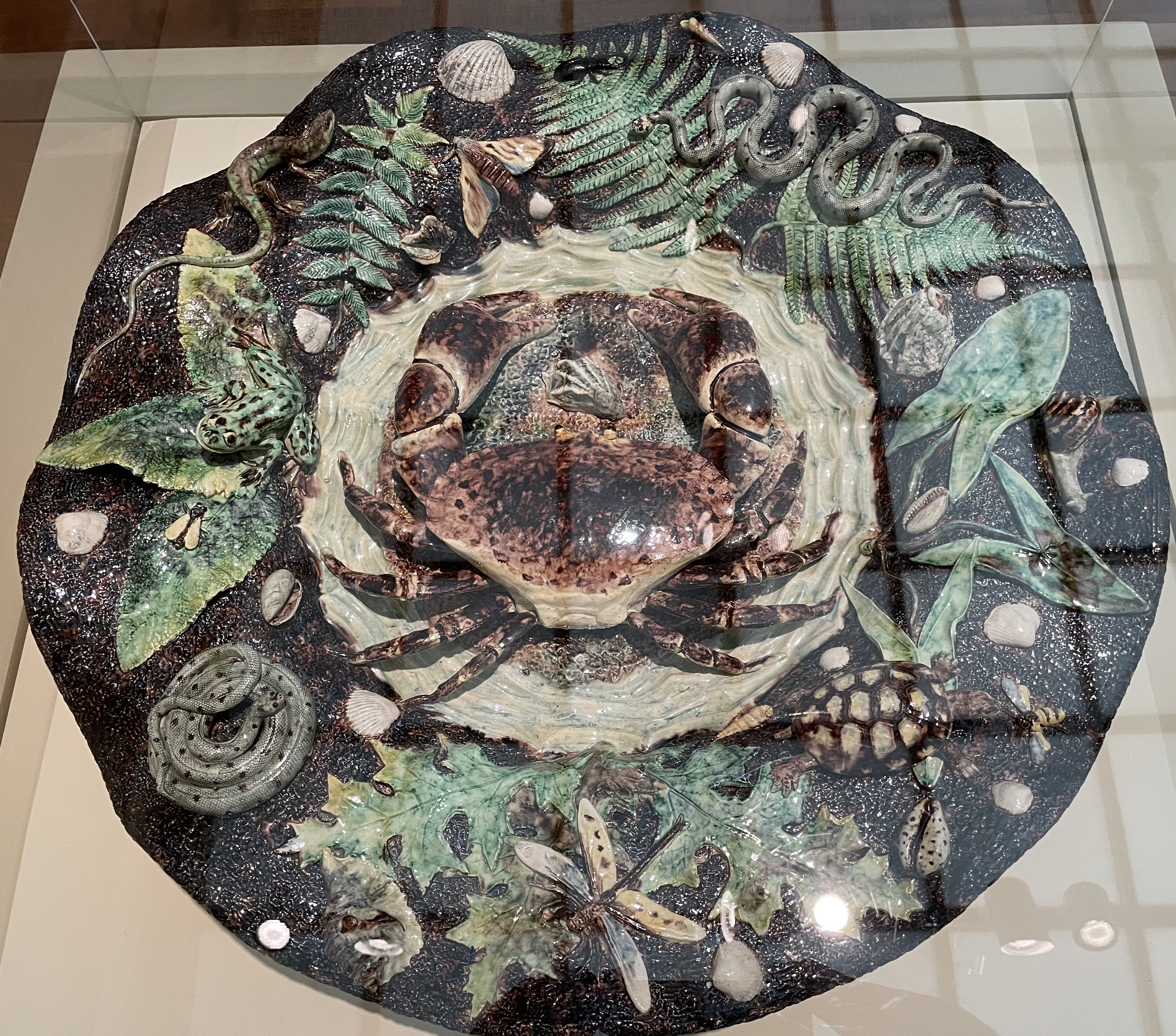
Charger attributed to the Barbizet Studio, glazed earthenware, c. 1850

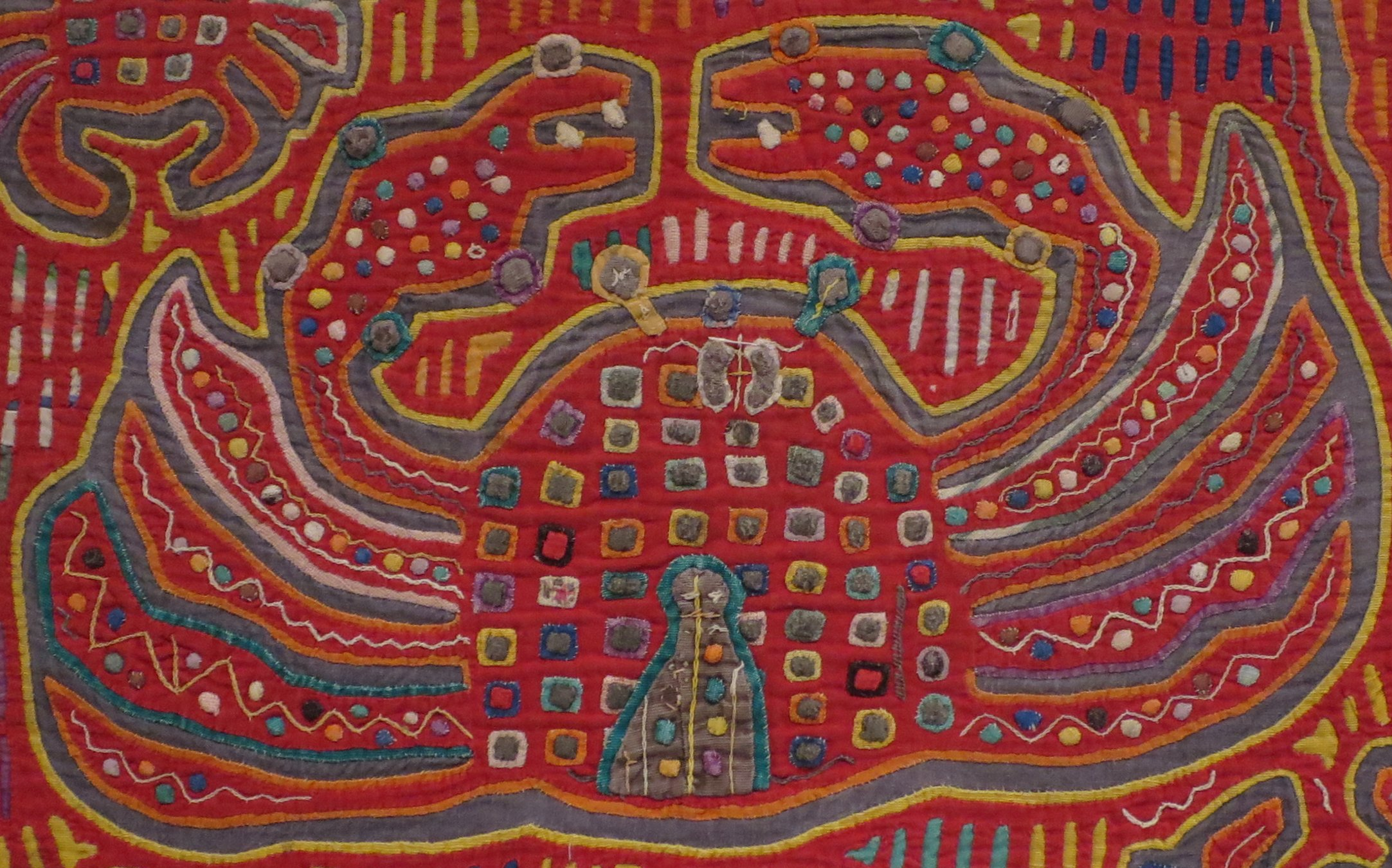
Mola appliqué blouse panel, Nulanega Island, Panama, 20th century

One of Rudyard Kipling's Just So Stories, "The Crab that Played with the Sea", tells the story of a gigantic crab who made the waters of the sea go up and down like the tides. The paleontologist Richard Fortey has identified Kipling's giant crab as a horseshoe crab. In Malay mythology, ocean tides were believed to be caused by water rushing in and out of a hole in the Navel of the Seas (Pusat Tasek), where "there sits a gigantic crab which twice a day gets out in order to search for food".

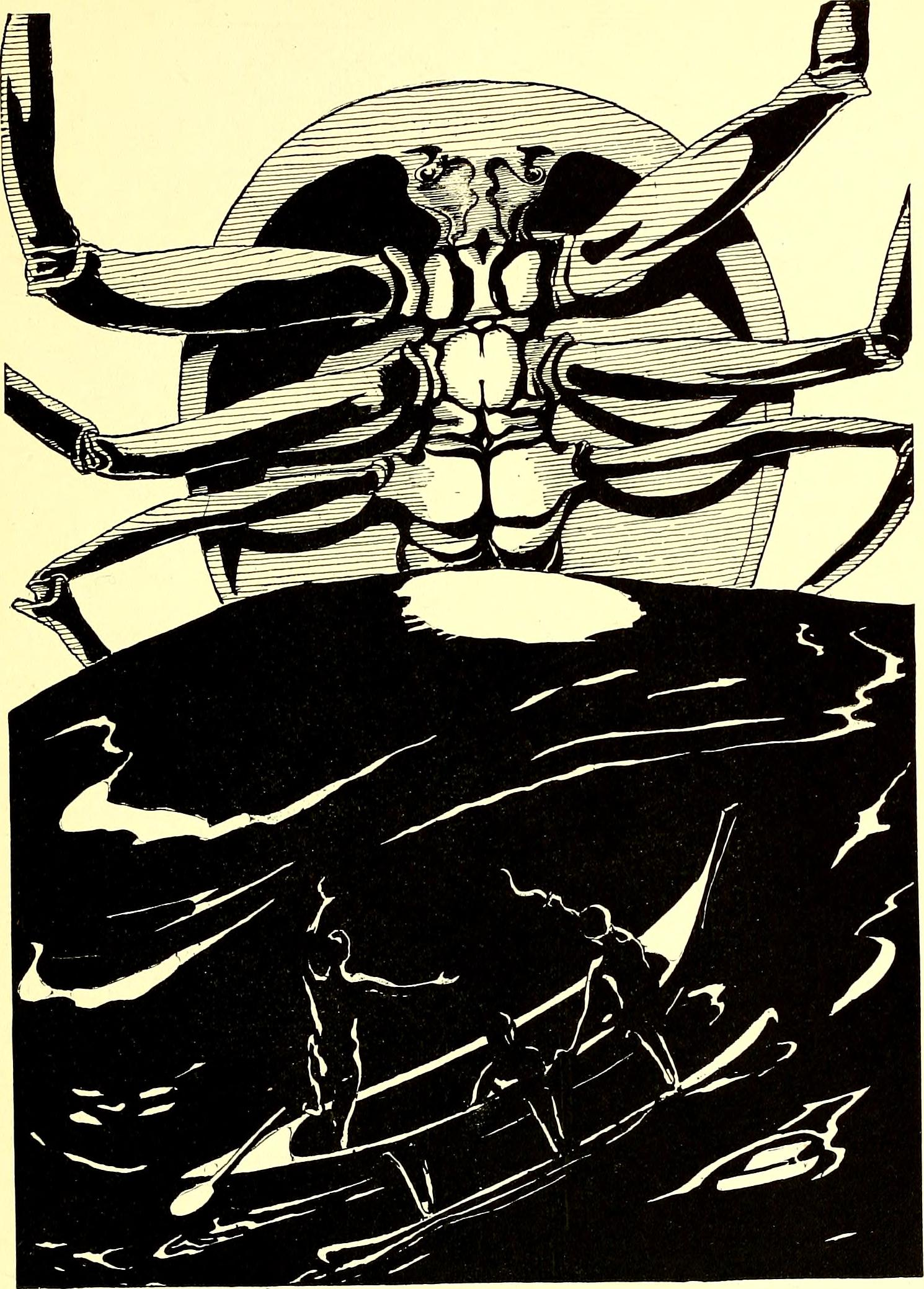
Illustration for "The Crab that Played with the Sea" (in Just So Stories), Rudyard Kipling, 1902

=== As pets ===
Hermit crabs are commonly kept as pets and used in the marine aquarium trade. A popular species is the Caribbean hermit crab, Coenobita clypeatus. They can live for 30 years in captivity if their requirements, including simulating a coastal rainforest, are met. The size of tank must be substantial. There must be a substrate of sand and coconut fibre that they can dig in to facilitate moulting. The temperature and humidity of the air must be controlled. A pool of fresh water and a pool of correctly formulated salt water are both necessary.

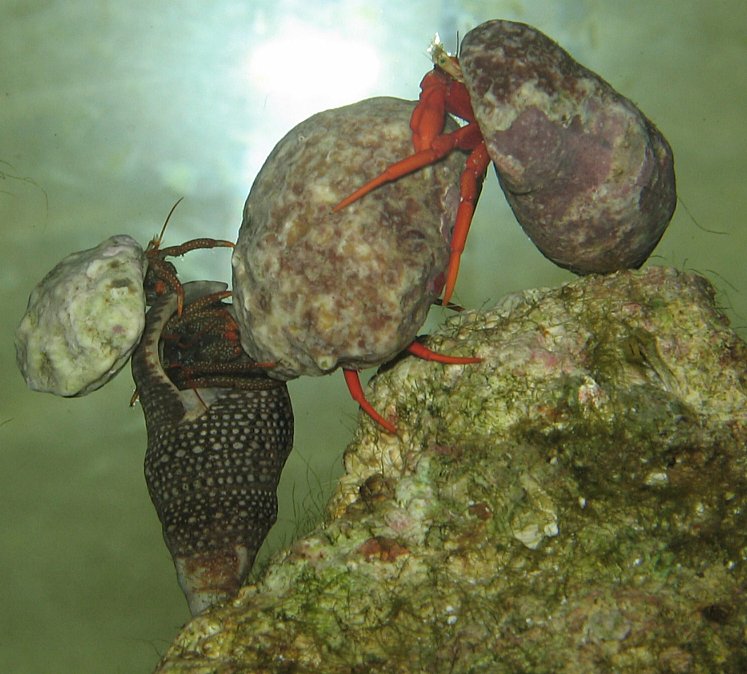
Hermit crabs in an aquarium

=== Meme ===
The zoologist Joanna Wolfe, writing in Scientific American, notes a popular meme which jokes that crabs are the "ultimate forms" of life as "everything will eventually evolve into a crab". Sara Kiley Watson, writing in Popular Science, comments that the joke "comes from an actual truth", that decapods span multiple crab-like groups, including the true crabs but not limited to them. Wolfe explains that the meme parodies the genuine process of carcinisation which has taken place in at least five different groups of decapods, but that the process does not apply to humans or other animals. The evolutionary palaeobiologist Matthew Wills comments that all the crabs are decapods, and the evolutionary pressures apply in a marine environment where defence, living in crevices, and being wave-swept favour armoured protection, a broad compact body, and the ability to scuttle sideways.

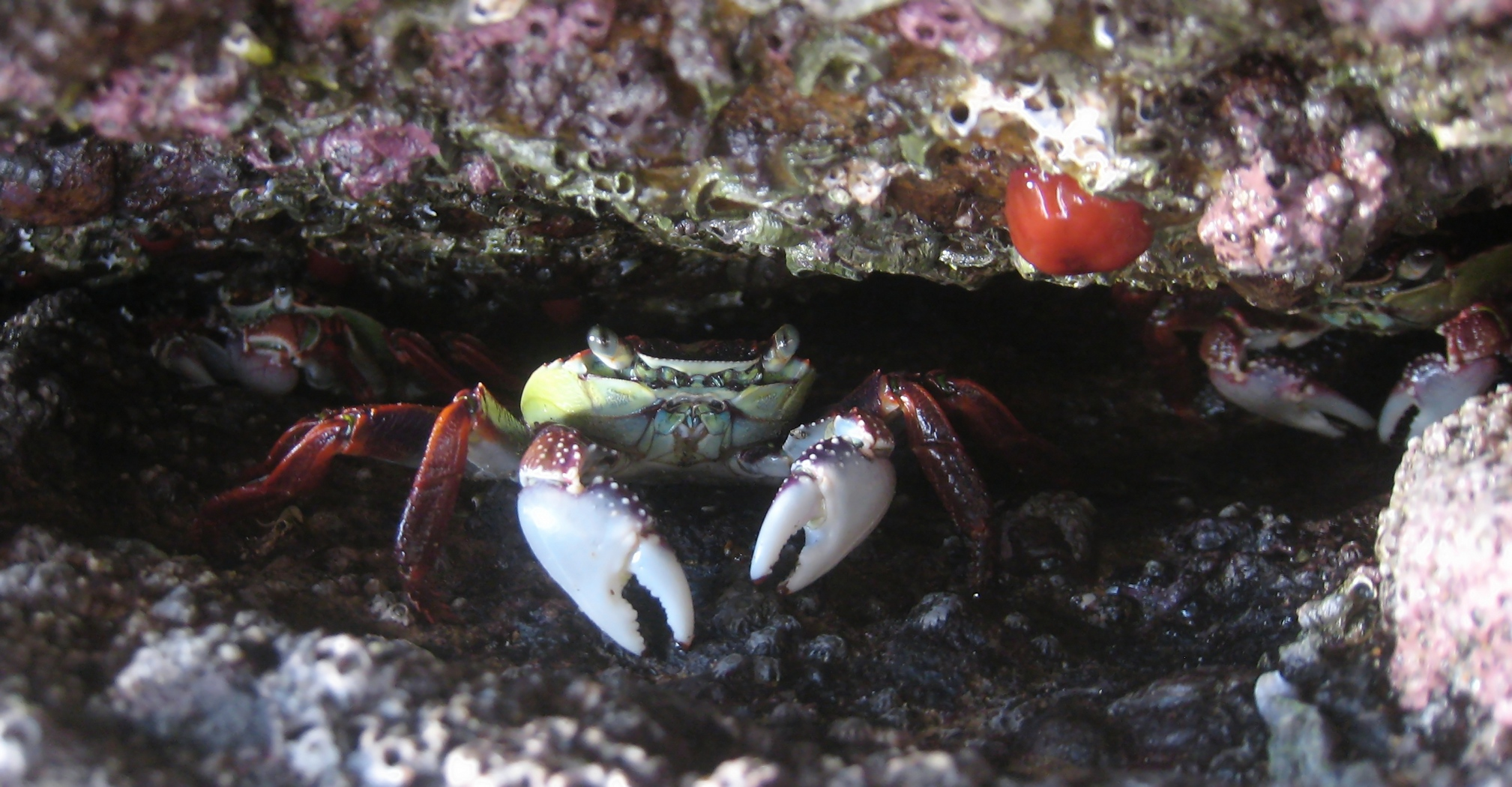
Decapods have repeatedly evolved a crablike body form under the pressures of predation and wave action. A broad low body, an armoured carapace, and the ability to scuttle sideways into a rock crevice all work well in a marine environment. This does not mean that all animals will evolve the same adaptations, as the crab meme wrongly suggests.
