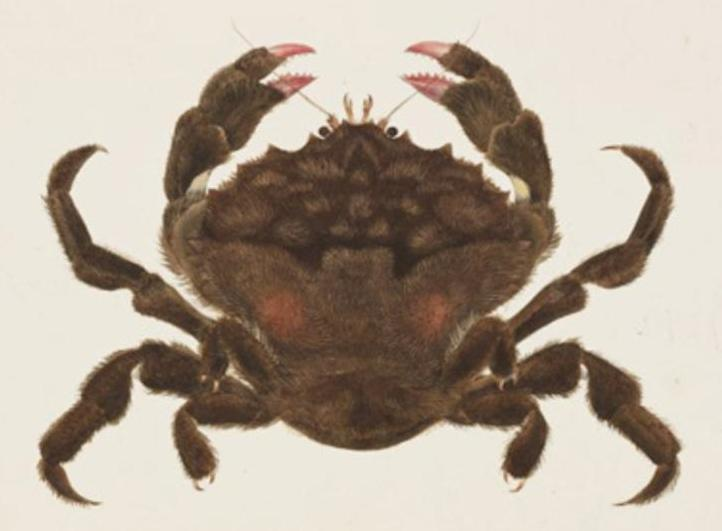
- Watercolour, 1823

Scientific classification
- Kingdom: Animalia
- Phylum: Arthropoda
- Class: Malacostraca
- Order: Decapoda
- Suborder: Pleocyemata
- Infraorder: Brachyura
- Family: Dromiidae
- Genus: Lauridromia
- Species: L. dehaani

Binomial name
- Lauridromia dehaani (Rathbun, 1923)

Synonyms
- Dromia dehaani Rathbun, 1923

= Lauridromia dehaani =

Species of crab

Lauridromia dehaani is a species of crab in the family Dromiidae. It is native to the Red Sea and the western Indo-Pacific. It often carries a piece of sponge on its carapace by way of camouflage, and if unable to find a suitable piece of sponge, carries an empty bivalve shell, a sprig of seaweed or a piece of debris instead.

== Description ==
Lauridromia dehaani is a plump crab and has a carapace (shell) that is slightly wider than it is long, with three sharply-pointed teeth on the rostrum (between the eyes) and four antero-lateral teeth at the side of the shell. The first three antero-lateral teeth are close together and the fourth more widely separated. The carapace has a covering of coarse hairs and some shaggy bristles near the margins. The pereiopods (walking legs) are smooth and the inner margin of the dactylus (seventh segment) of the second and third pair bear 16 to 20 minute spines. The outer margins of the propodus (sixth segment) of the third and fourth legs have no spines, nor does the inner margin of the dactylus of the fifth leg. These factors help to distinguish this species from the closely related Lauridromia intermedia.

== Distribution ==
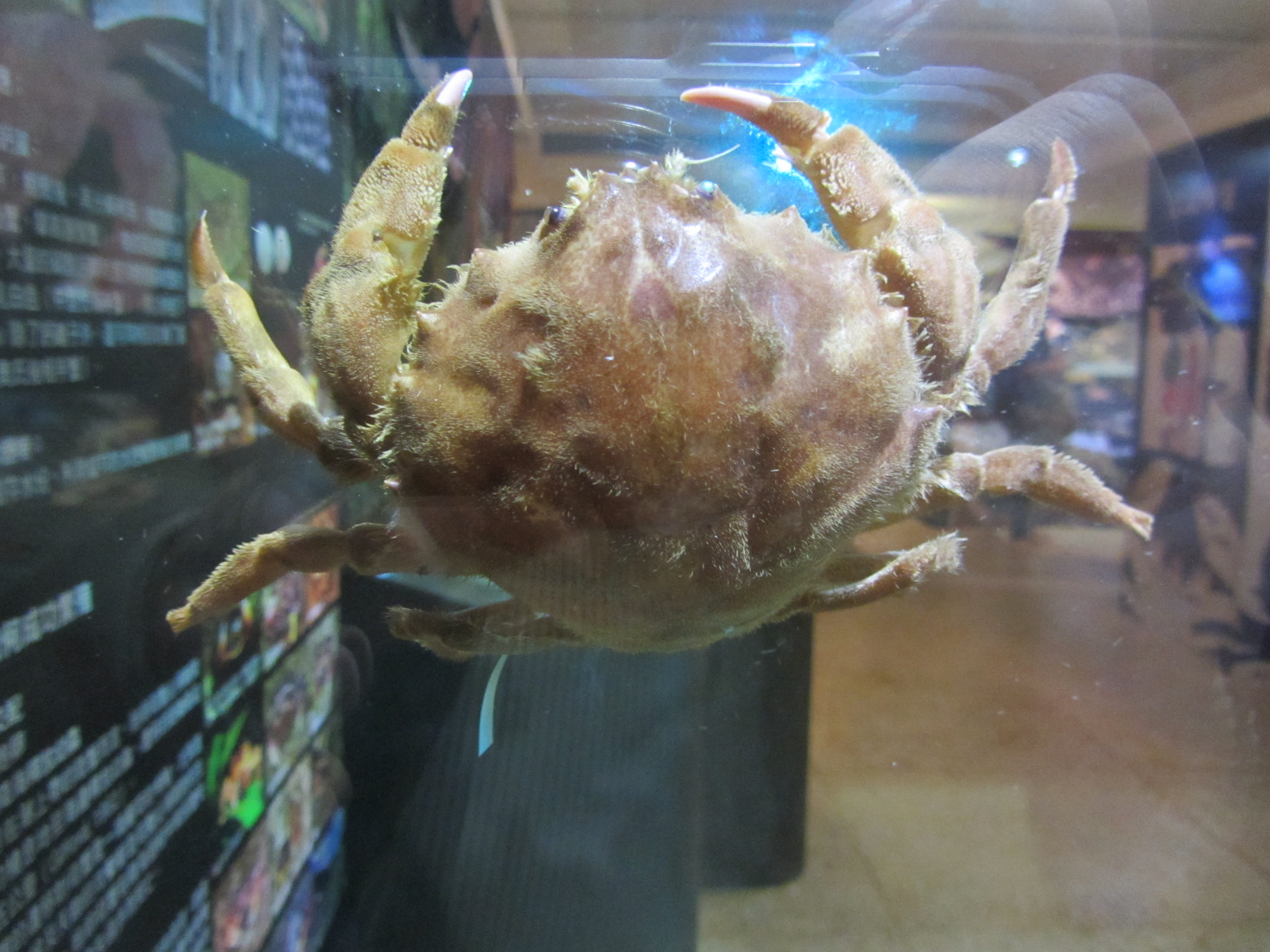
Museum specimen

Lauridromia dehaani is native to the western Indo-Pacific region. Its range extends from the Red Sea, Mozambique and South Africa to India, Japan, Guangdong and Taiwan.

== Ecology ==
Lauridromia dehaani can be found subtidally and on mudflats uncovered at low tide. It probably feeds on fragments of algae and other vegetation. It searches out a sponge, often a species of Suberites, and uses its chelae to fashion a piece to the approximate size of its carapace, and then moulds this in place. It will carefully cut a piece of sponge growing on a rock or remove some from the surface of a shell. If it is unable to find a suitable sponge, it may steal some from another crab, or use a substitute material; an empty bivalve mollusc shell, a bit of rag, some seaweed, leaves or rubbish. If it later finds some sponge or a more desirable camouflage than it is currently wearing, it will discard the unwanted material and select the preferred one. It has been shown that the crab has a spatial memory and is able to find its way back to where a sponge previously removed from it has been cached. In another experiment, an octopus easily detected an unadorned crab but failed to locate a camouflaged one. In the crab's symbiotic arrangement with the sponge, it is unclear what benefit, if any, is obtained by the sponge.
