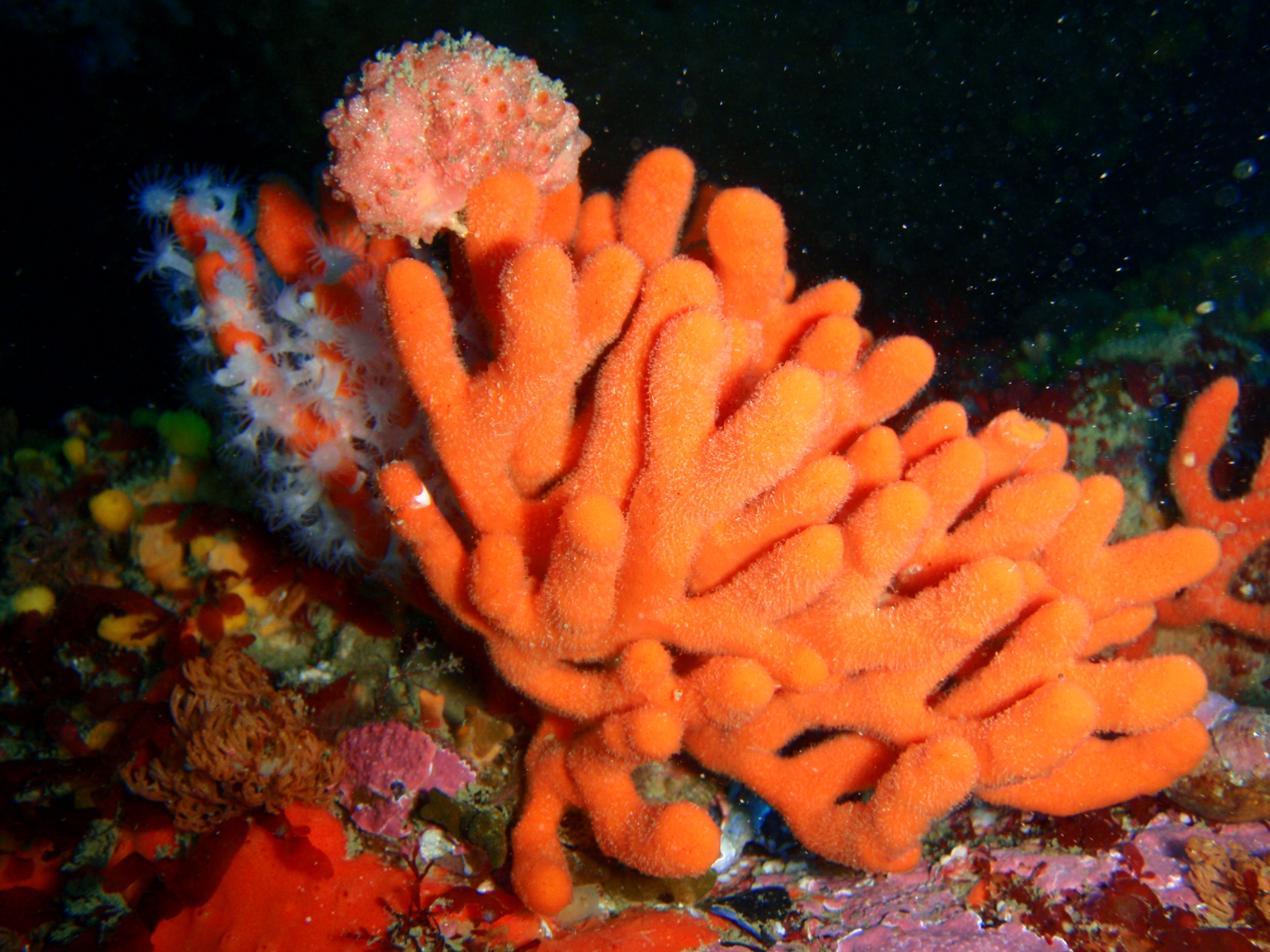
- Orange tree sponge (Echinoclathria dichotoma) with crab at Dreadlocks Reef, near Cape Town. The white polyps on the left are Parazoanthus, which is often found growing on sponges. The sponge crab is probably Pseudodromia latens under the cover of a colonial ascidian which it carries for protection.

Scientific classification
- Kingdom: Animalia
- Phylum: Porifera
- Class: Demospongiae
- Order: Poecilosclerida
- Family: Microcionidae
- Subfamily: Ophlitaspongiinae
- Genus: Echinoclathria; Carter, 1885

= Echinoclathria =

Genus of sponges

Echinoclathria is a genus of demosponge in the family Microcionidae.

== Species ==
Species in the genus include:

- Echinoclathria arborea (Tanita, 1968)
- Echinoclathria arcifera (Schmidt, 1880)
- Echinoclathria atlantica Sarà, 1978
- Echinoclathria axinelloides (Dendy, 1896)
- Echinoclathria bergquistae Hooper, 1996
- Echinoclathria beringensis (Hentschel, 1929)
- Echinoclathria chalinoides (Carter, 1885)
- Echinoclathria confragosa (Hallmann, 1912)
- Echinoclathria contexta Sarà, 1978
- Echinoclathria dichotoma (Lévi, 1963)
- Echinoclathria digitata (Lendenfeld, 1888)
- Echinoclathria digitiformis (Row, 1911)
- Echinoclathria egena Wiedenmayer, 1989
- Echinoclathria gibbosa (Keller, 1889)
- Echinoclathria inornata (Hallmann, 1912)
- Echinoclathria leporina (Lamarck, 1814)
- Echinoclathria levii Hooper, 1996
- Echinoclathria minor (Burton, 1959)
- Echinoclathria nodosa Carter, 1885
- Echinoclathria notialis Hooper, 1996
- Echinoclathria noto (Tanita, 1963)
- Echinoclathria oxeata (Bergquist & Fromont, 1988)
- Echinoclathria parkeri Hooper, 1996
- Echinoclathria retepora (Lendenfeld, 1887)
- Echinoclathria reticulata (Bergquist & Fromont, 1988)
- Echinoclathria riddlei Hooper, 1996
- Echinoclathria rimosa (Ridley, 1884)
- Echinoclathria robusta (Keller, 1889)
- Echinoclathria subhispida Carter, 1885
- Echinoclathria translata (Pulitzer-Finali, 1978)
- Echinoclathria vasa Lehnert, Stone & Heimler, 2006
- Echinoclathria waldoschmitti de Laubenfels, 1954
