= Cancer personatus =

Cancer personatus has been used as a scientific name for two different species of crab:

- Cancer personatus Linnaeus, 1758 is the basionym of Dromia personata (Linnaeus, 1758)
- Cancer personatus Herbst, 1785 is a junior synonym of Corystes cassivelaunus (Pennant, 1777)
