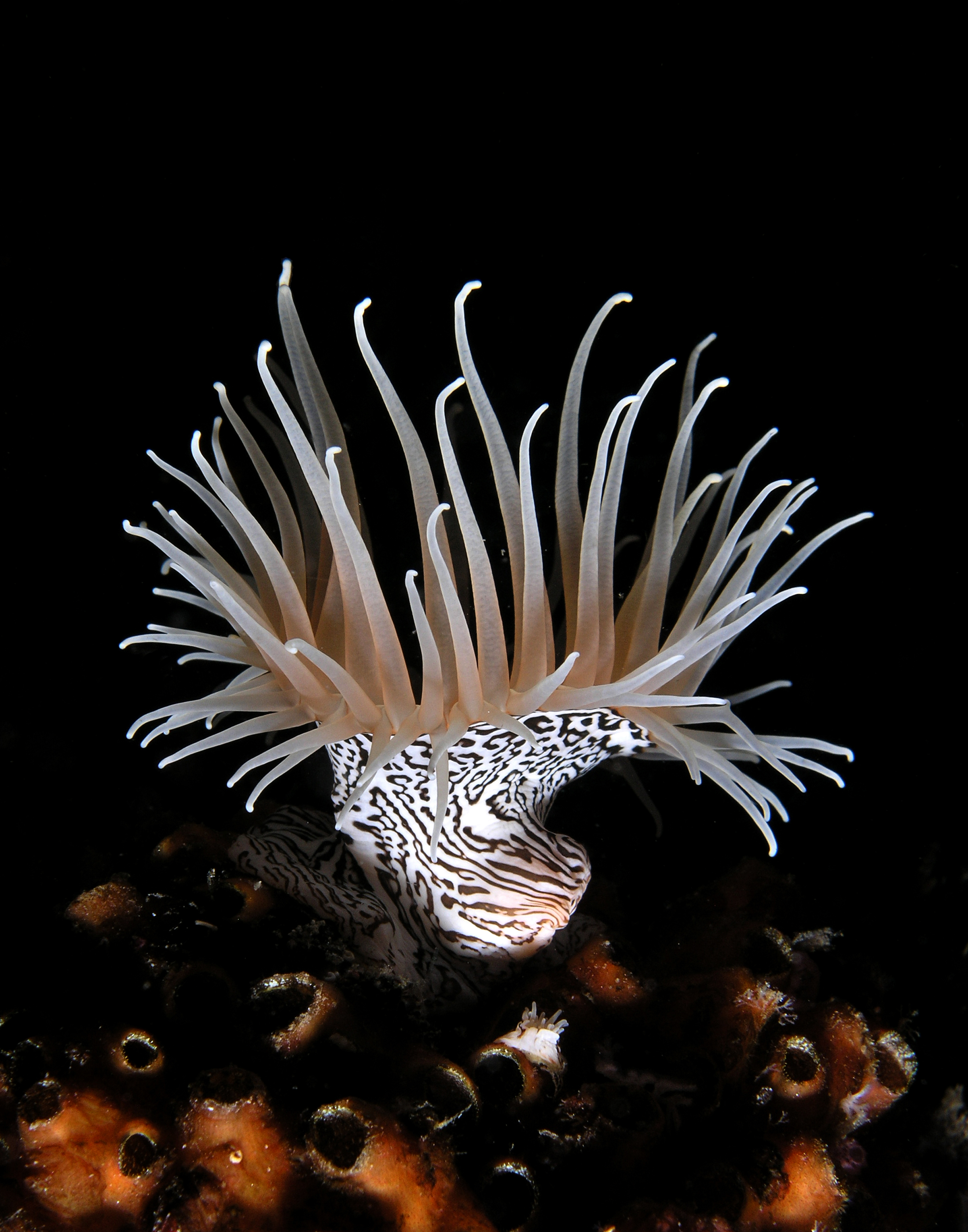
- A zebra-striped gorgonian wrapper in the waters off East Timor

Scientific classification
- Domain: Eukaryota
- Kingdom: Animalia
- Phylum: Cnidaria
- Subphylum: Anthozoa
- Class: Hexacorallia
- Order: Actiniaria
- Family: Nemanthidae
- Genus: Nemanthus
- Species: N. annamensis

Binomial name
- Nemanthus annamensis Carlgren, 1943

= Nemanthus annamensis =

Species of sea anemone

Nemanthus annamensis, commonly known as the gorgonian wrapper, is a species of sea anemone found in central Indo-Pacific waters.

== Description ==
Nemanthus annamensis has a rather variably shaped base and low, spreading column, widening slightly just below the oral disc. This bears 120 to 130 tentacles, the inner ones longer than the outer, and a slit-shaped mouth with two siphonoglyphs. The column and tentacles are white, yellowish or orange, variegated with dark patches, and the oral disc is semi-transparent.

== Distribution and habitat ==
N. annamensis is native to the Indo-Pacific area. It was first described from the Gulf of Tonkin: annamensis signifies "of Annam", a historical name for central and northern Vietnam. It has also been found in the Indian Ocean off the coast of Kenya. It has a habit of attaching itself by its base and wrapping itself around the branches of gorgonians, the coral-like sea whips and sea fans, hence its common name.

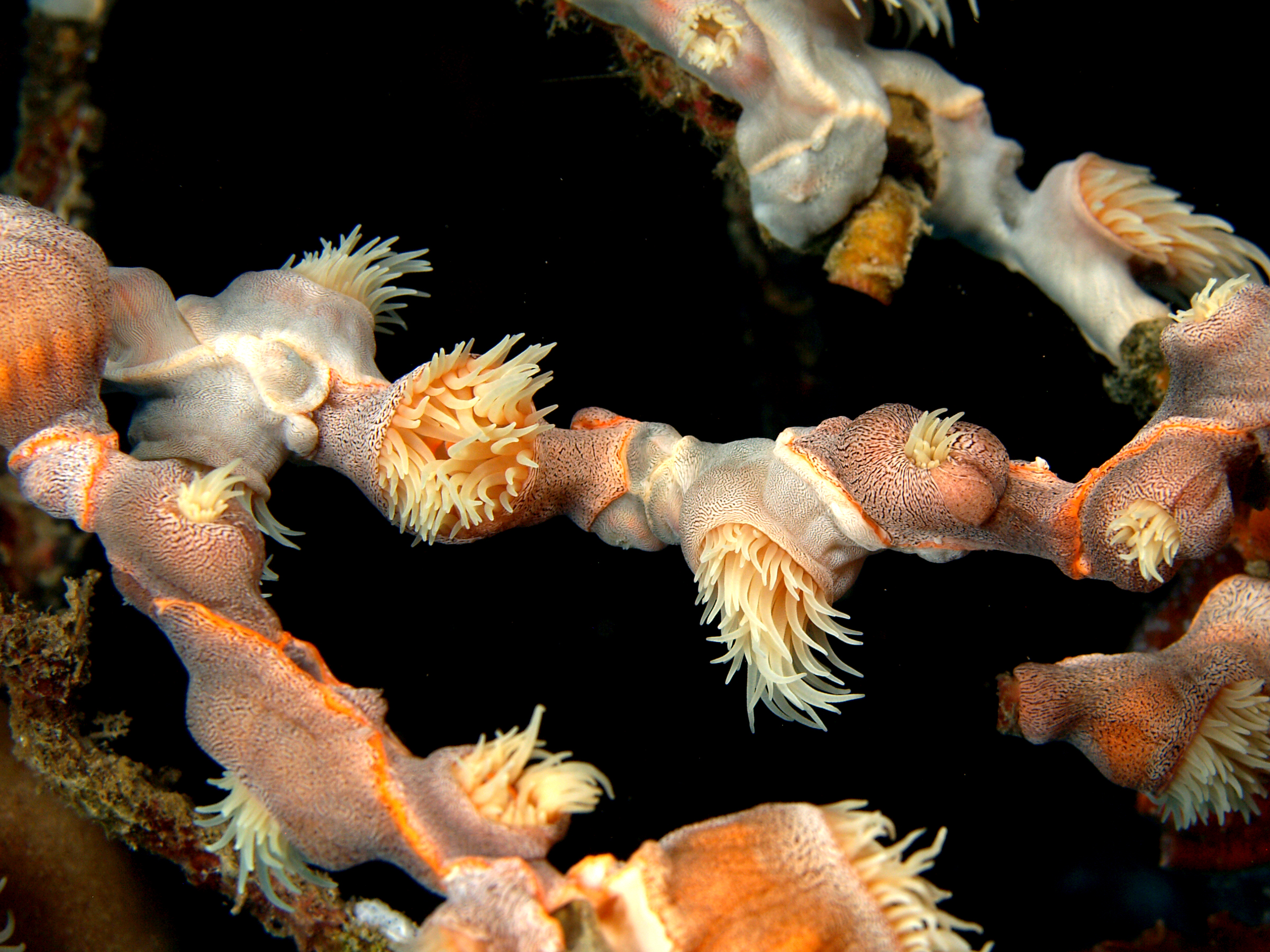
Nemanthus annamensis wrapped around a gorgonian

== Ecology ==
N. annamensis has been found living in association with the crab Lauridromia intermedia. Crabs in the family Dromiidae are often known as "sponge crabs" due to their habit of carrying bits of sponge, and occasionally other objects, on their carapace. In this instance, the crab was carrying a specimen of N. annamensis, holding it in place with cheliped-like structures on the end of its fourth and fifth pairs of legs. The sea anemone was not attached to the crab's shell and seemed to be happy with being carried around as it extended its tentacles in a normal manner. It would seem that the crab uses the anemone as camouflage or takes advantage of the anemone's nematocysts as a defence against predators.

N. annamensis is a host of the parasite Gastroecus caulleryi, a copepod.
