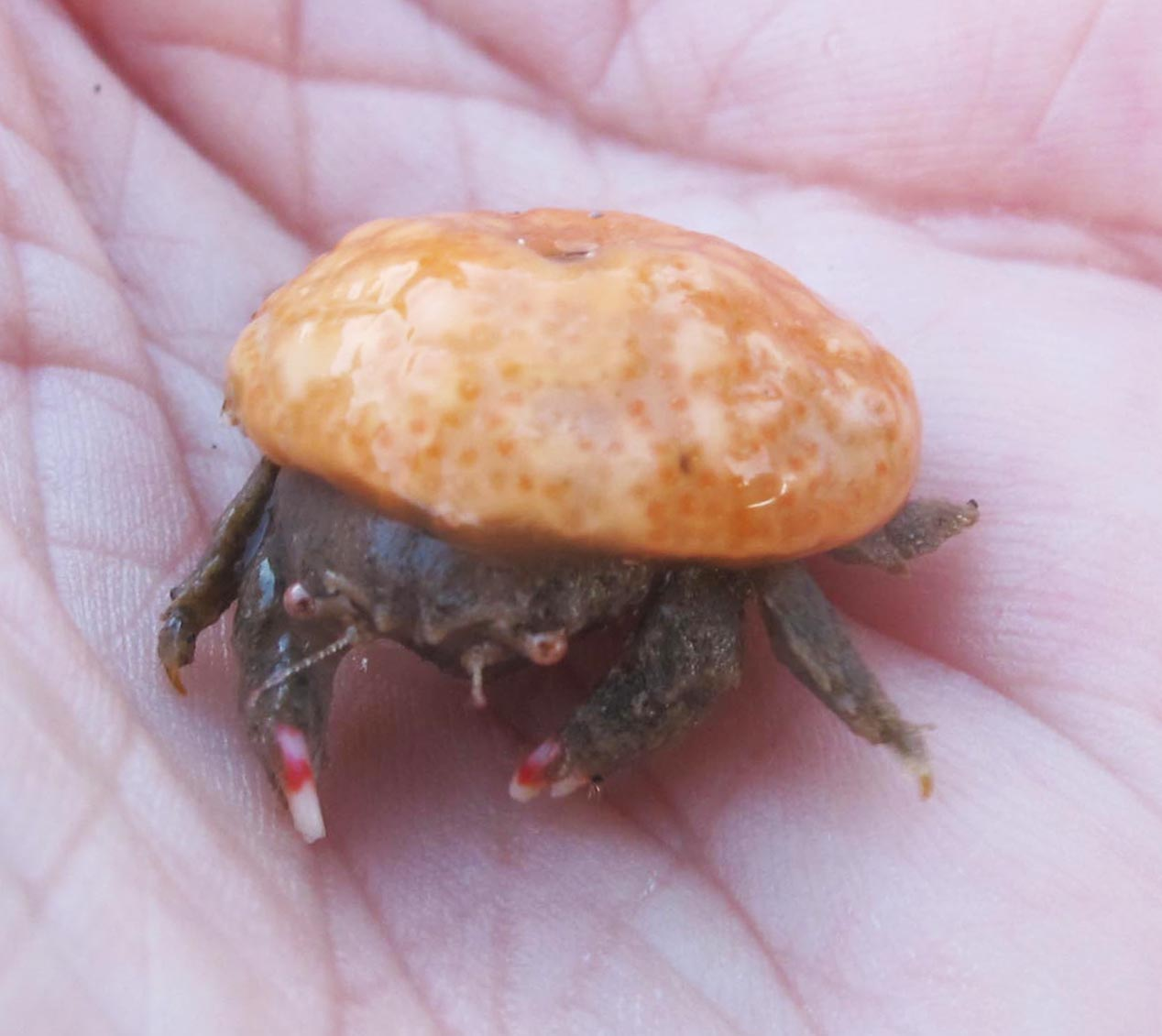
- Moreiradromia antillensis from a tidepool on the island of Nevis
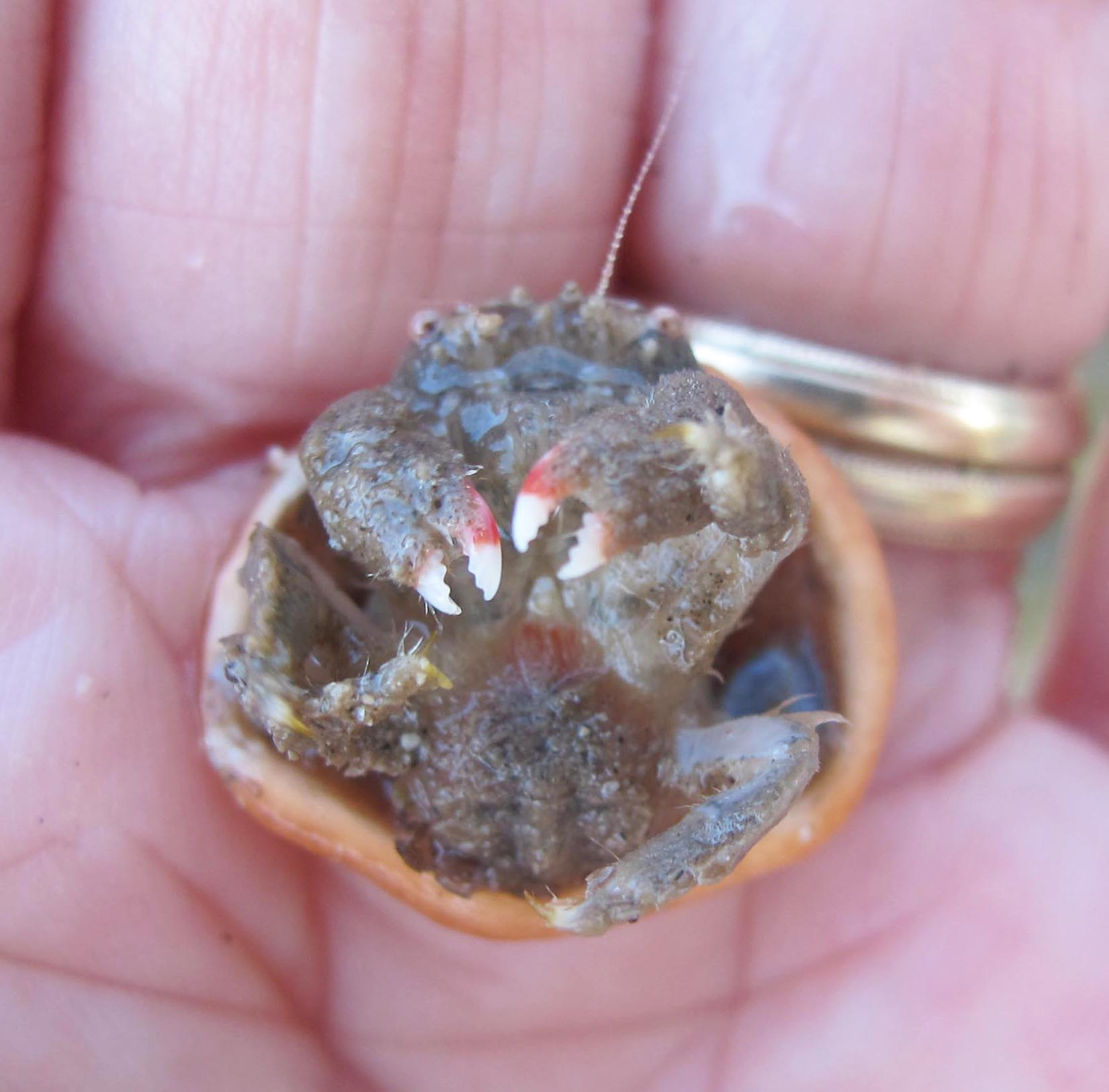
- Ventral view of same crab

Scientific classification
- Kingdom: Animalia
- Phylum: Arthropoda
- Class: Malacostraca
- Order: Decapoda
- Suborder: Pleocyemata
- Infraorder: Brachyura
- Family: Dromiidae
- Genus: Moreiradromia
- Species: M. antillensis

Binomial name
- Moreiradromia antillensis (Stimpson, 1858)

= Moreiradromia antillensis =

Species of crustacean

Moreiradromia antillensis is a species of decapods in the family sponge crab. This species lives in the Western and central Atlantic Ocean.

== Description ==
The carapace is brownish-gray and has short hairs along its body. The tips of its claws are bright red and whitish. The crab covers itself at the dorsal region with fragments of sea squirts, seaweed, tunicates, and sponges, earning them the popular name of "hairy sponge crabs" or "decorator crabs". The crab consciously camouflaging itself from predators, the sponge crab uses their claws to carve up the tunicate or sponge as its shelter and cover.

== Distribution ==
Ranging from the intertidal region to deeper waters (500m), they can be found from the Western Atlantic from Bermuda and North Carolina to Brazil; central Atlantic from Ascension and St. Helena Islands.

== Ecology ==
These crabs use drag powered swimming drag powered swimming to move around. They typically hide during the day, and foraging at night. They have special setae on their claws that enable easier grasp and motion. They are scavengers, and eat dead plants and animals it may come across. They also often have symbiotic, mutualistic relationships with other organisms. For instance, species like sea anemones may be capable to sting, so this provides more protection for the crabs from potential predators. Males can grow up to 20.9 mm, while juveniles are around 7.9 mm.

== Bibliography ==
- Almeida, Alexandre O., et al. "Shallow-water anomuran and brachyuran crabs (Crustacea: Decapoda) from southern Bahia, Brazil/Cangrejos anomuros y braquiuros (Crustacea: Decapoda) de aguas someras del sur de Bahia, Brasil." Latin American Journal of Aquatic Research, vol. 38, no. 3, Nov. 2010, pp. 329+. Gale Academic OneFile, link.gale.com/apps/doc/A305746417/AONE?u=mlin_b_bumml&sid=bookmark-AONE&xid=724855ef. Accessed 19 Mar. 2022.
- Silva, K. C., et al. “Update on Crustaceans Known from the Amazonian Continental Shelf and Adjacent Oceanic Areas.” Crustaceana, vol. 93, no. 7, 2020, pp. 687–701., https://doi.org/10.1163/15685403-bja10062.
