= Lamarckdromia excavata =

Scientific classification
- Kingdom: Animalia
- Phylum: Arthropoda
- Clade: Pancrustacea
- Class: Malacostraca
- Order: Decapoda
- Suborder: Pleocyemata
- Infraorder: Brachyura
- Family: Dromiidae
- Genus: Lamarckdromia
- Species: L. excavata

Binomial name
- Lamarckdromia excavata (Stimpson, 1858)

Synonyms
- Dromidia excavata Stimpson, 1858

Species of crab

Lamarckdromia excavata is a species of crab within the family Dromiidae. The species is endemic to the Indo-Pacific near Australia, being found at depths of 30 to 180 meters in benthic environments.
