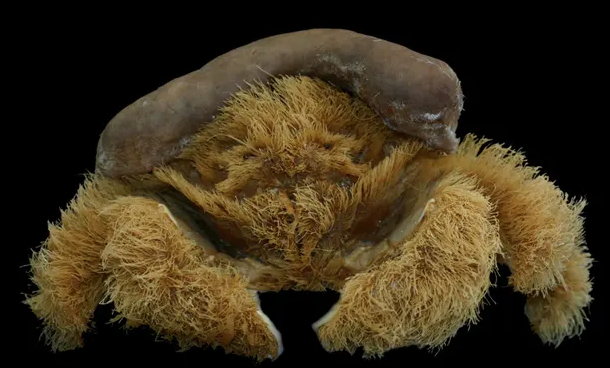
- Lamarckdromia beagle

Scientific classification
- Kingdom: Animalia
- Phylum: Arthropoda
- Class: Malacostraca
- Order: Decapoda
- Suborder: Pleocyemata
- Infraorder: Brachyura
- Family: Dromiidae
- Genus: Lamarckdromia
- Species: L. beagle

Binomial name
- Lamarckdromia beagle McLay & Hosie, 2022

= Lamarckdromia beagle =

Species of crab

Lamarckdromia beagle (often called fluffy crab) is a crab species in the family Dromiidae, described in 2022.

== Description ==
Lamarckdromia beagle usually is 4–9 cm (1.6–3.5 in) wide, and its body and legs are covered with long golden colored fur. Its clawed frontal legs are slightly larger than the pereiopods, or walking legs. The rearmost pair of walking legs is smaller than the others and shifted to the side of the abdomen, having been specially adapted for holding sponges to the body. Like other sponge crabs, the crab cuts a sponge or ascidian with its chelae and trims it to shape, which it holds with its hind legs for camouflague in a manner that looks similar to human headwear. They let the sponge grow and fit the shape of the crab's body. The sea sponge produces toxins to deter aquatic predators from eating it or the crab.

== Distribution and habitat ==
This crab is found in the Indian Ocean and on the west coasts of Western Australia. It can live in shallow waters, and down in deepwater a few hundred meters deeply. It especially lives near sea sponges, at the bottom of rocky shores for protection and camouflage.

== Discovery ==
A Lamarckdromia beagle washed ashore off Western Australia's south coast and was found by a Danish family, who sent it to the Western Australia Museum for identification. Andrew Hosie, a crustacean and worm curator at the Western Australian Museum, and Colin McLay, a marine biologist affiliated with the University of Canterbury in New Zealand, then described the crab as a new species, one of the three species in the genus Lamarckdromia. Comparing the new crab with other specimens in the museum's collection, several specimens of L. beagle that had previously been misidentified were discovered. The earliest specimen they found dates from December 1925. The crab species is named after the research ship that carried Charles Darwin around the world in his expeditions, HMS Beagle.
