= Nemanthus californicus =

Scientific classification
- Domain: Eukaryota
- Kingdom: Animalia
- Phylum: Cnidaria
- Subphylum: Anthozoa
- Class: Hexacorallia
- Order: Actiniaria
- Family: Nemanthidae
- Genus: Nemanthus
- Species: N. californicus

Binomial name
- Nemanthus californicus Carlgren, 1940

Species of sea anemone

Nemanthus californicus is a species of sea anemone in the genus Nemanthus.
