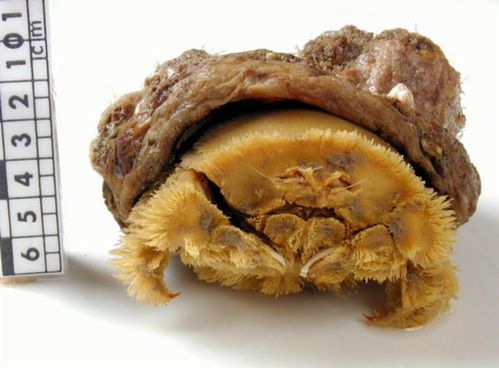
- Lamarckdromia globosa found in Australia

Scientific classification
- Domain: Eukaryota
- Kingdom: Animalia
- Phylum: Arthropoda
- Class: Malacostraca
- Order: Decapoda
- Suborder: Pleocyemata
- Infraorder: Brachyura
- Family: Dromiidae
- Subfamily: Dromiinae
- Genus: Lamarckdromia; Guinot & Tavares, 2003

= Lamarckdromia =

Genus of crabs

Lamarckdromia is a genus of crabs within the family Dromiidae, containing 3 species. The most recent species described, Lamarckdromia beagle, was discovered in Australia after being washed onto a beach in 2022. Its species name beagle is in recognition of Charles Darwin’s ship HMS Beagle.

== Species ==
There are three species:

- Lamarckdromia beagle McLay & Hosie, 2022
- Lamarckdromia excavata (Stimpson, 1858)
- Lamarckdromia globosa (Lamarck, 1818)
