= Silicatein =

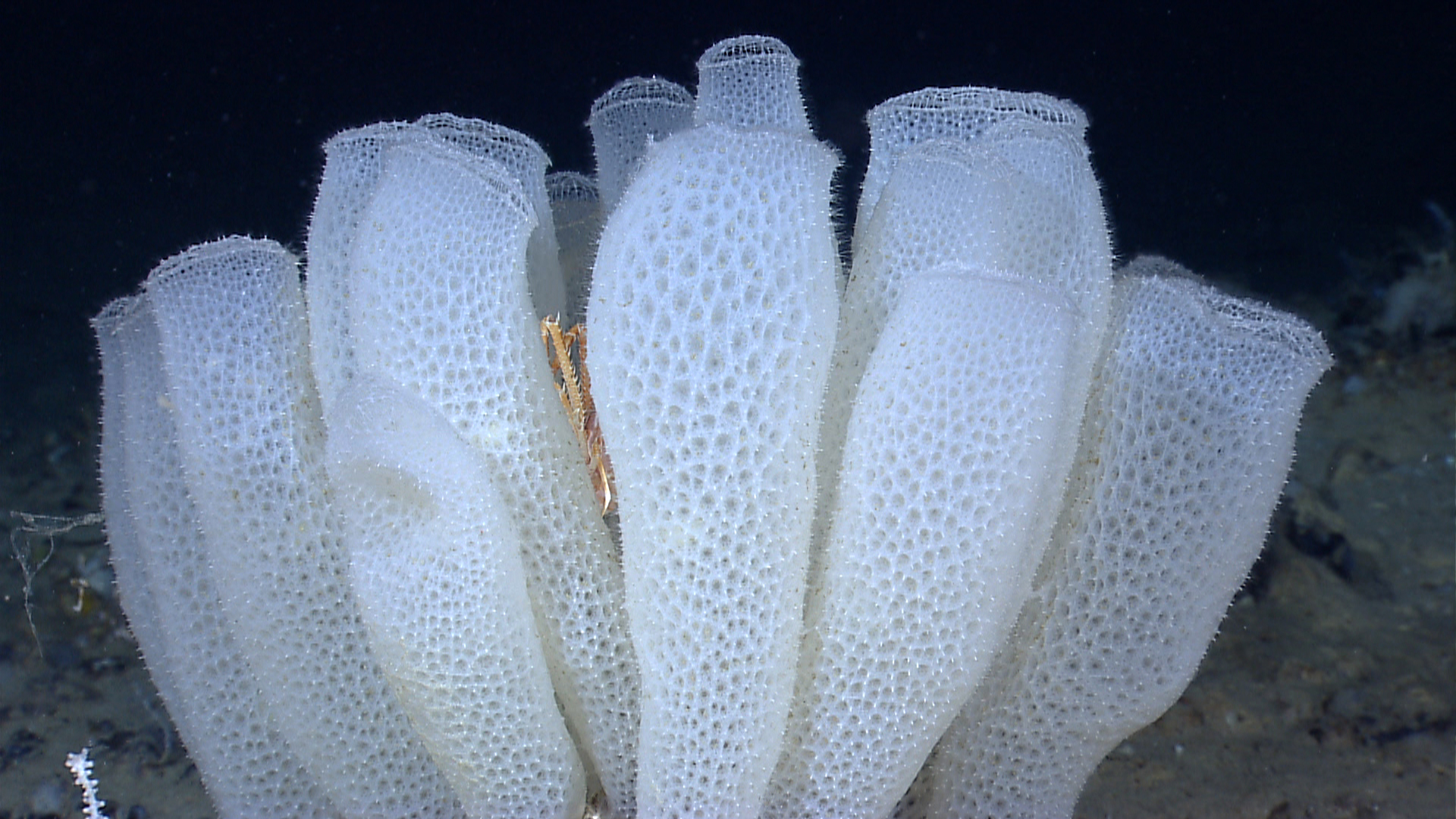
The Venus' flower basket sponge, which produces silicatein

Silicateins are enzymes which catalyse the formation of biosilica from monomeric silicon compounds (such as silicic acid) extracted from the natural environment. Environmental silicates are absorbed by specific biota, including diatoms, radiolaria, silicoflagellates, and siliceous sponges; silicateins have so far only been found in sponges. Silicateins are homologous to the cysteine protease cathepsin.

In sponges, the silicatein enzymes reside in the axial filaments of the axial canals of the siliceous spicules.

In contrast, diatoms do not use silicateins but rather small specialised peptides called silaffins which attach long chain polyamines (LCPAs) to lysine groups. Free LCPAs can also cooperate with silaffins. Both silicateins and silaffins form higher-order structures which act both as structural templates (for exoskeletons) and mechanistic catalysts for the polycondensation reactions of silicon-compounds.

The Venus' flower basket siliceous sponge is a well-known example of an organism that utilises silicatein. It is known for its remarkable ability to extract silicic acid from surrounding seawater, which is then converted into complex 3D silica structures at ambient temperatures underwater, something human engineering capabilities are unable to replicate without the use of high-temperature.

Another example of silicatein-utilising organisms are the suberites, a genus of sea sponge in the family Suberitidae. Suberites consist mostly of cells, in contrast with other Porifera (such as the class Hexactinellida, to which the Venus' flower basket belongs) which are syncytial. The extracellular matrix of siliceous spicules give suberites their structural foundation; these consist of bio-silica, a silicon dioxide polymer. These inorganic structures provide support for the animals. Silica deposition begins intracellularly and is carried out by the enzyme silicatein. Silicateins are modulated by a group of proteins called silintaphins The process occurs in specialized cells known as sclerocytes.

Lubomirskia baikalensis, also known as Lake Baikal sponge, has been studied to explore the gene family of silicateins and their role in the morphogenesis of these sponges.
