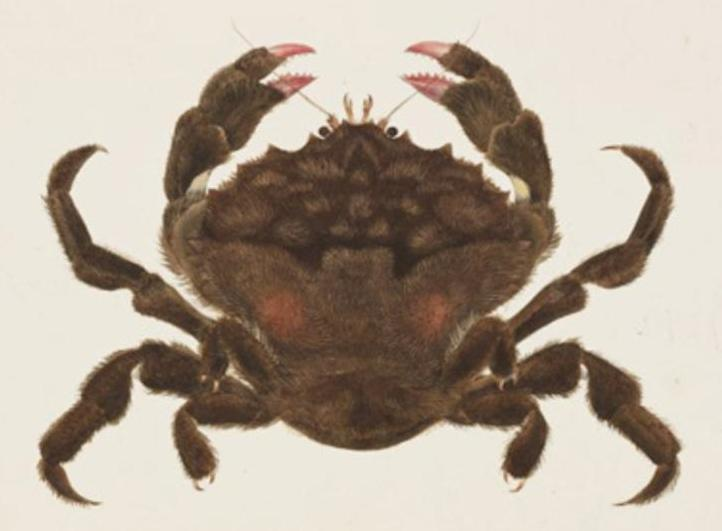
- Lauridromia dehaani

Scientific classification
- Domain: Eukaryota
- Kingdom: Animalia
- Phylum: Arthropoda
- Class: Malacostraca
- Order: Decapoda
- Suborder: Pleocyemata
- Infraorder: Brachyura
- Family: Dromiidae
- Subfamily: Dromiinae
- Genus: Lauridromia; McLay, 1993

Type species
- Lauridromia intermedia (Laurie, 1906)

= Lauridromia =

Genus of crabs

Lauridromia is a genus of crabs in the family Dromiidae. It contains only two species. At one time a third species, Lauridromia indica, was included in the genus but that has now been transferred to the genus Dromidiopsis as Dromidiopsis indica (Gray, 1831).

== Species ==
The World Register of Marine Species includes:

- Lauridromia dehaani (Rathbun, 1923)
- Lauridromia intermedia (Laurie, 1906)
