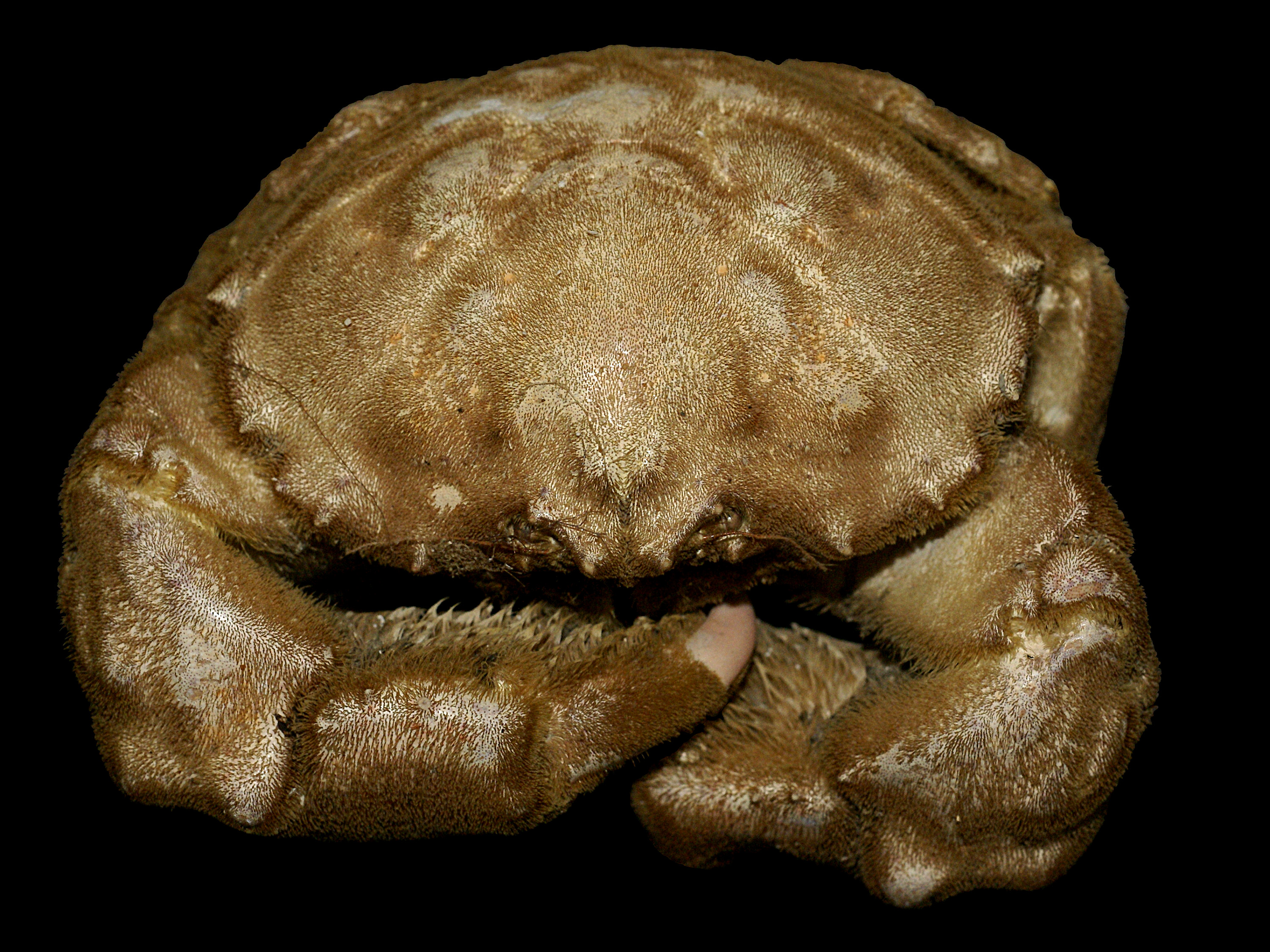
- Dromia personata

Scientific classification
- Domain: Eukaryota
- Kingdom: Animalia
- Phylum: Arthropoda
- Class: Malacostraca
- Order: Decapoda
- Suborder: Pleocyemata
- Infraorder: Brachyura
- Family: Dromiidae
- Subfamily: Dromiinae
- Genus: Dromia; Weber, 1795

Type species
- Cancer personatus Linnaeus, 1758

= Dromia =

Genus of crabs

Dromia is a genus of crabs in the family Dromiidae. It contains the following species:

- Dromia bollorei Forest, 1974
- †Dromia corvini Bittner, 1893
- Dromia erythropus (George Edwards, 1771)
- †Dromia evae Collins, 2014
- †Dromia fossata (Müller & Collins, 1991)
- Dromia marmorea Forest, 1974
- †Dromia neogenica Müller, 1979
- Dromia nodosa A. Milne-Edwards & Bouvier, 1898
- Dromia personata (Linnaeus, 1758)
- †Dromia subglobosa (Müller & Collins, 1991)
