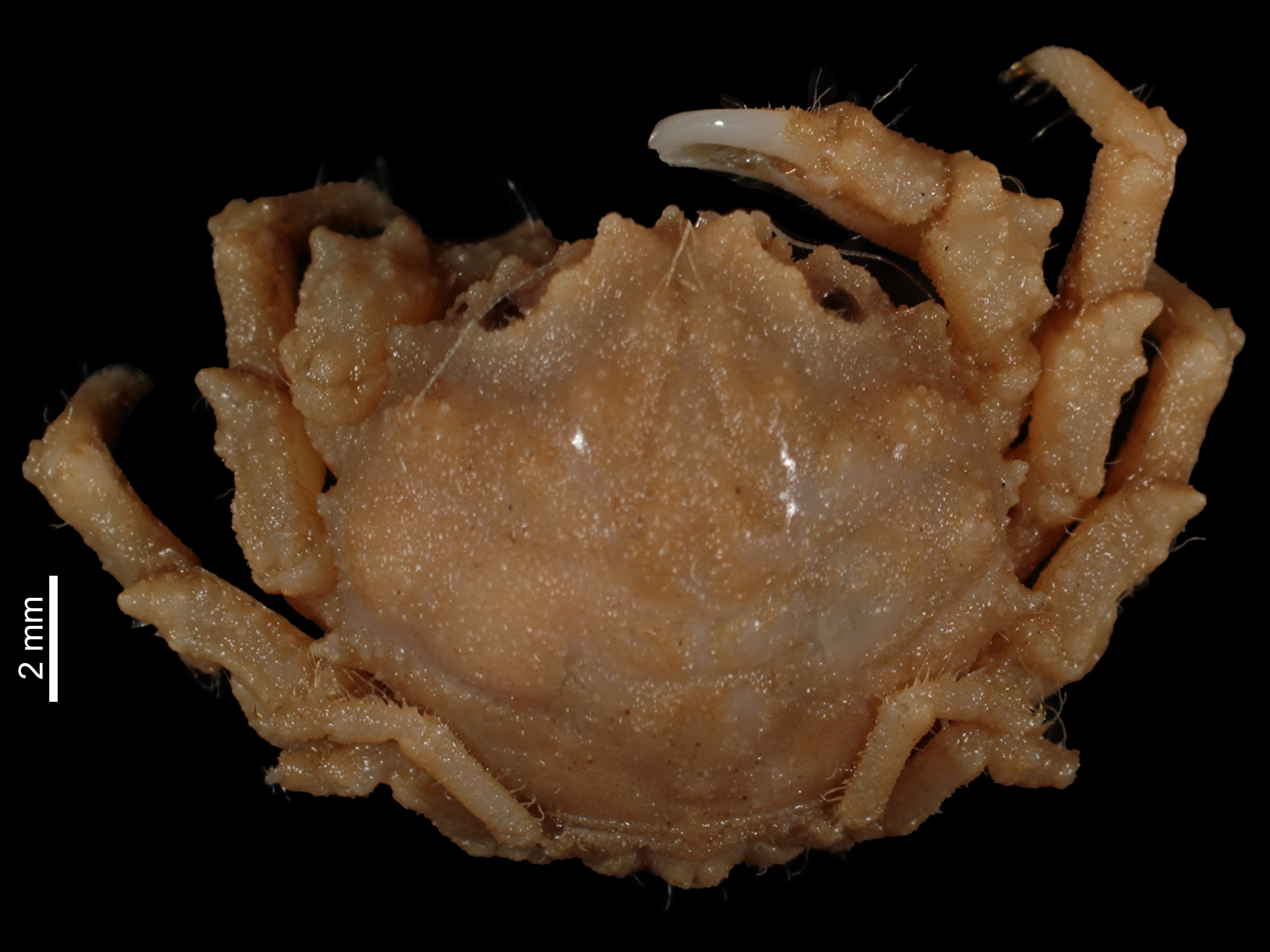
- Epigodromia rugosa

Scientific classification
- Domain: Eukaryota
- Kingdom: Animalia
- Phylum: Arthropoda
- Class: Malacostraca
- Order: Decapoda
- Suborder: Pleocyemata
- Infraorder: Brachyura
- Family: Dromiidae
- Genus: Epigodromia; McLay, 1993

Type species
- Epidromia granulata Kossman, 1878

Synonyms
- Epidromia Kossman, 1878

= Epigodromia =

Epigodromia Temporal range: 0.012–Recent Ma

Genus of crabs

Epigodromia is a genus of crabs within the family Dromiidae, that first appeared during the Holocene epoch.

== Species ==
- Epigodromia acutidens (Sakai, 1983)
- Epigodromia areolata (Ihle, 1913)
- Epigodromia ebalioides (Alcock, 1900)
- Epigodromia gilesii (Alcock, 1900)
- Epigodromia globosa (Lewinsohn, 1977)
- Epigodromia granulata (Kossman, 1878)
- Epigodromia nodosa (Sakai, 1936)
- Epigodromia rotunda McLay, 1993
- Epigodromia rugosa McLay, 1993
- Epigodromia sculpta (Haswell, 1882)
