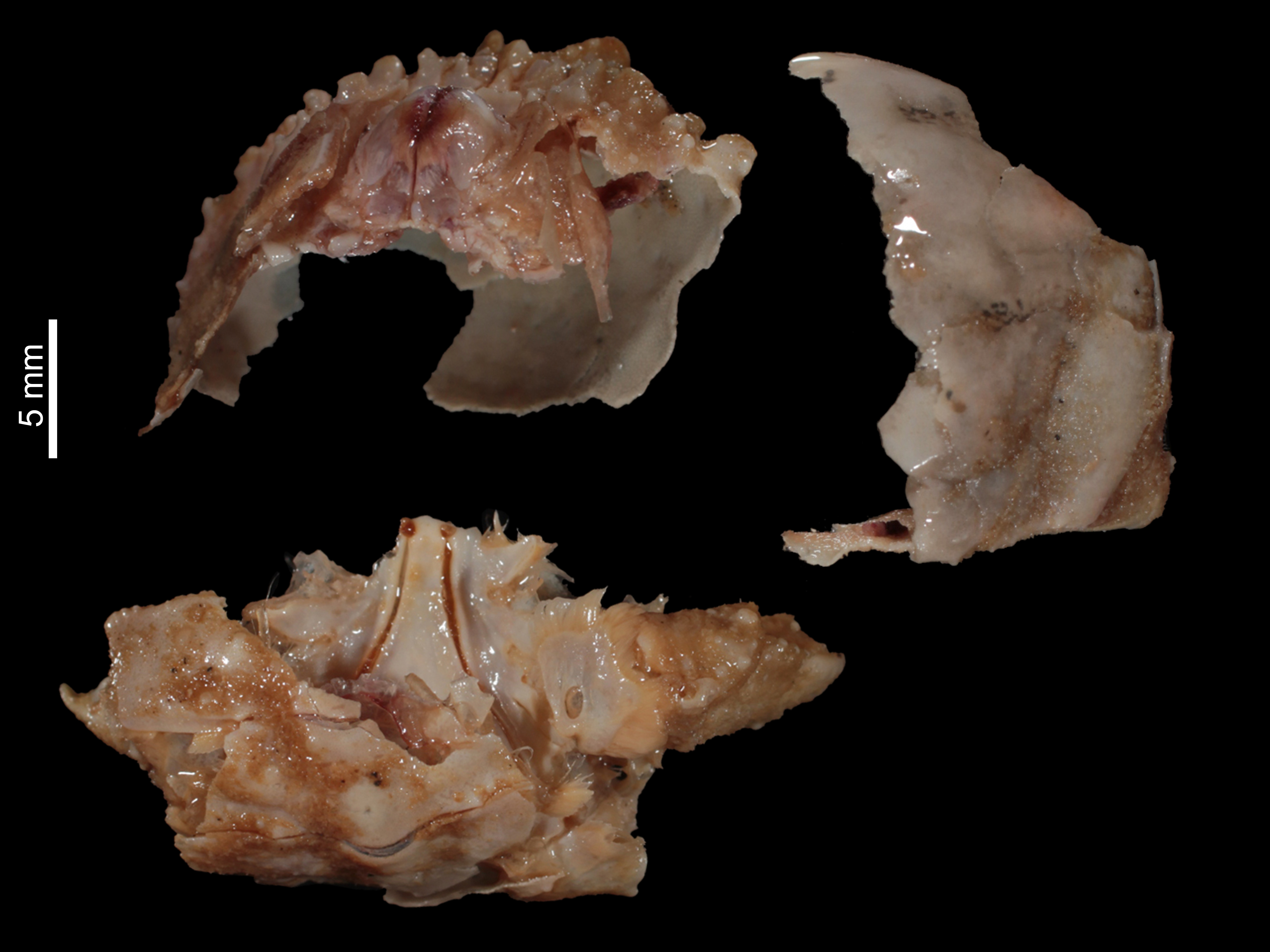
- Fultodromia nodipes

Scientific classification
- Domain: Eukaryota
- Kingdom: Animalia
- Phylum: Arthropoda
- Class: Malacostraca
- Order: Decapoda
- Suborder: Pleocyemata
- Infraorder: Brachyura
- Family: Dromiidae
- Genus: Fultodromia; McLay, 1993

Type species
- Dromia nodipes Guérin, 1832

= Fultodromia =

Fultodromia Temporal range: 0.012–Recent Ma

Genus of crabs

Fultodromia is a genus of crabs within the family Dromiidae, with 2 species currently assigned to the genus.

== Species ==
- Fultodromia nodipes (Guérin, 1832)
- Fultodromia spinifera (Montgomery, 1931)
