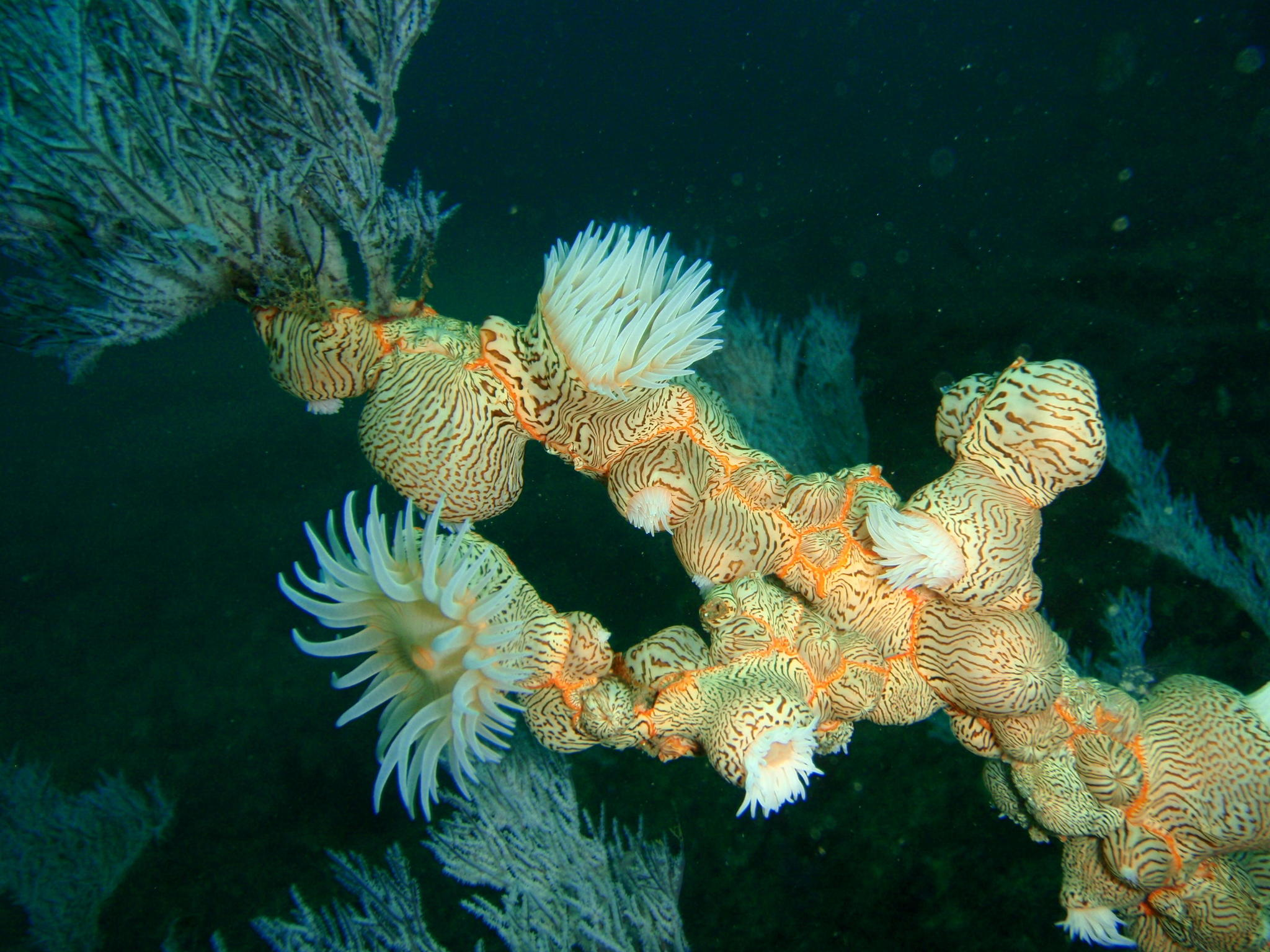

Scientific classification
- Domain: Eukaryota
- Kingdom: Animalia
- Phylum: Cnidaria
- Subphylum: Anthozoa
- Class: Hexacorallia
- Order: Actiniaria
- Family: Nemanthidae
- Genus: Nemanthus
- Species: N. nitidus

Binomial name
- Nemanthus nitidus (Wassilieff, 1908)

= Nemanthus nitidus =

Species of sea anemone

Nemanthus nitidus, the zebra gorgonian wrapper, is a species of sea anemone within the family Nemanthidae. The species is found in the western Pacific near areas such as Korea, Japan, New Caledonia and the Philippines at depths of 30 to 70 meters. It grows to lengths of 2 to 3 centimeters.
