= Lauridromia intermedia =

Scientific classification
- Domain: Eukaryota
- Kingdom: Animalia
- Phylum: Arthropoda
- Class: Malacostraca
- Order: Decapoda
- Suborder: Pleocyemata
- Infraorder: Brachyura
- Family: Dromiidae
- Genus: Lauridromia
- Species: L. intermedia

Binomial name
- Lauridromia intermedia (Laurie, 1906)

Synonyms
- Dromia intermedia Laurie, 1906

Species of crab

Lauridromia intermedia is a species of crab in the family Dromiidae and is native to the western Indo-Pacific. It often carries a piece of sponge on its back by way of camouflage, and one individual was found carrying a sea anemone in a similar manner.

== Description ==
Lauridromia intermedia is a small crab with a maximum carapace width of 60 mm (2.4 in) for males and 50 mm (2.0 in) for females. The carapace is covered in short hair and there are shaggy bristles round the margins. It is nearly circular in shape and the rostrum has three teeth, the central one being smaller than the other two. This crab has robust chelipeds bearing a number of tubercles. The second and third legs are much longer than the fourth and fifth. These latter have three or four spines on the dactylus, two or three small ones and a single opposable large one. The carapace is orangish or yellowish-brown with a small dark red patch near the front. The tips of the chelipeds are pink.

== Distribution ==
Lauridromia intermedia is found in shallow water in the western Indo-Pacific. Its range includes the East African coast, Madagascar, the Seychelles, Australia, New Caledonia, the Philippines, Japan and Taiwan. Its depth range is 7 to 150 m (23 to 492 ft) but it is seldom found deeper than 40 m (131 ft).

== Ecology ==
Crabs in the family Dromiidae are often known as "sponge crabs" due to their habit of carrying bits of sponge on their carapace, clipping them to size and shape. Sometimes instead they carry colonial ascidians and occasionally other objects. Lauridromia intermedia usually carries a piece of sponge, holding it in place with the claw-like spines on the end of its fourth and fifth pairs of legs.

After a scientific trawl along the sandy seabed off the coast of Kenya, an individual Lauridromia intermedia was brought to the surface carrying a specimen of the sea anemone Nemanthus annamensis on its back. It was holding the sea anemone in place with its two hind legs, the spines being sunk into the gelatinous column. The sea anemone was not attached to the crab's shell and appeared not to be distressed by being carried around in this way. It would seem that the crab was using the anemone as camouflage, or taking advantage of the anemone's nematocysts as a defence against predators.
