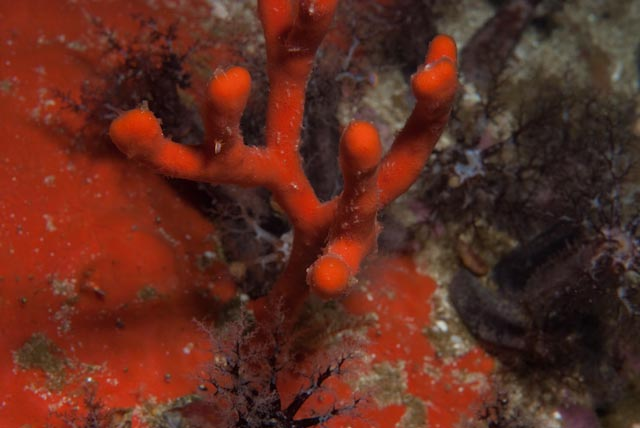

Scientific classification
- Kingdom: Animalia
- Phylum: Porifera
- Class: Demospongiae
- Order: Poecilosclerida
- Family: Microcionidae
- Genus: Echinoclathria
- Species: E. dichotoma

Binomial name
- Echinoclathria dichotoma (Lévi, 1963)

Synonyms
- Ophlitaspongia dichotoma Lévi, 1963

= Tree sponge =

Species of sponge

The tree sponge (Echinoclathria dichotoma) is a species of demosponge. It is known from the west coast of South Africa to Cape Agulhas. It is endemic to this region.

== Description ==
The tree sponge may grow to 150 mm (5.9 in) in height. It is a bright red to dirty orange sponge which grows upright and branches like a tree. The surface texture is smooth and the branch tips are rounded. Its oscula are small (<1 mm (0.039 in) and inconspicuous. The surface may be covered in a slimy mucus.

== Distribution and habitat ==
This sponge is found on the south and west coasts of South Africa where it lives on rocky reefs subtidally to 69 m (226 ft).

== Ecology ==
This sponge is often colonised by a white zoanthid, Parazoanthus sp.
