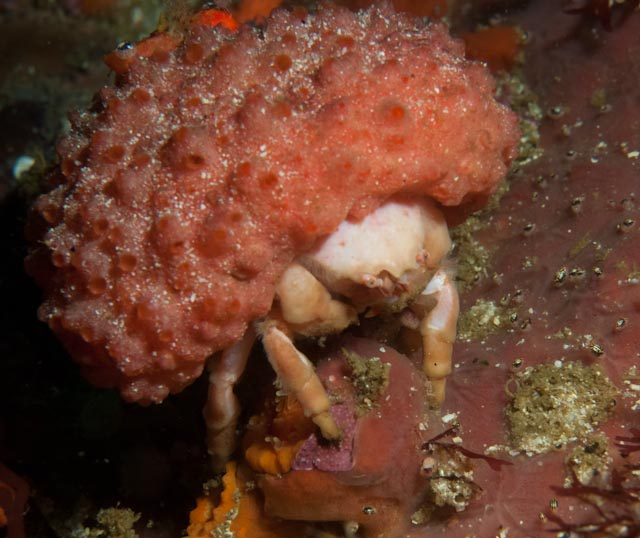
- Pseudodromia latens

Scientific classification
- Kingdom: Animalia
- Phylum: Arthropoda
- Clade: Pancrustacea
- Class: Malacostraca
- Order: Decapoda
- Suborder: Pleocyemata
- Infraorder: Brachyura
- Family: Dromiidae
- Subfamily: Dromiinae
- Genus: Pseudodromia; Stimpson, 1858

= Pseudodromia =

Genus of crabs

Pseudodromia is a genus of crabs in the family Dromiidae, often referred to as sponge crabs. They are small or medium-sized crabs which get their name from the ability to shape a living sponge into a portable shelter for themselves. A sponge crab cuts out a fragment from a sponge and trims it to its own shape using its claws. The last two pairs of legs are shorter than other legs and bend upward over the crab's carapace, to hold the sponge in place. The sponge grows along with the crab, providing a consistent shelter.

== Species ==
The genus contains the following species:

- Pseudodromia cacuminis Kensley, 1980
- Pseudodromia latens Stimpson, 1858
- Pseudodromia rotunda (MacLeay, 1838)
- Pseudodromia trepida Kensley, 1978
