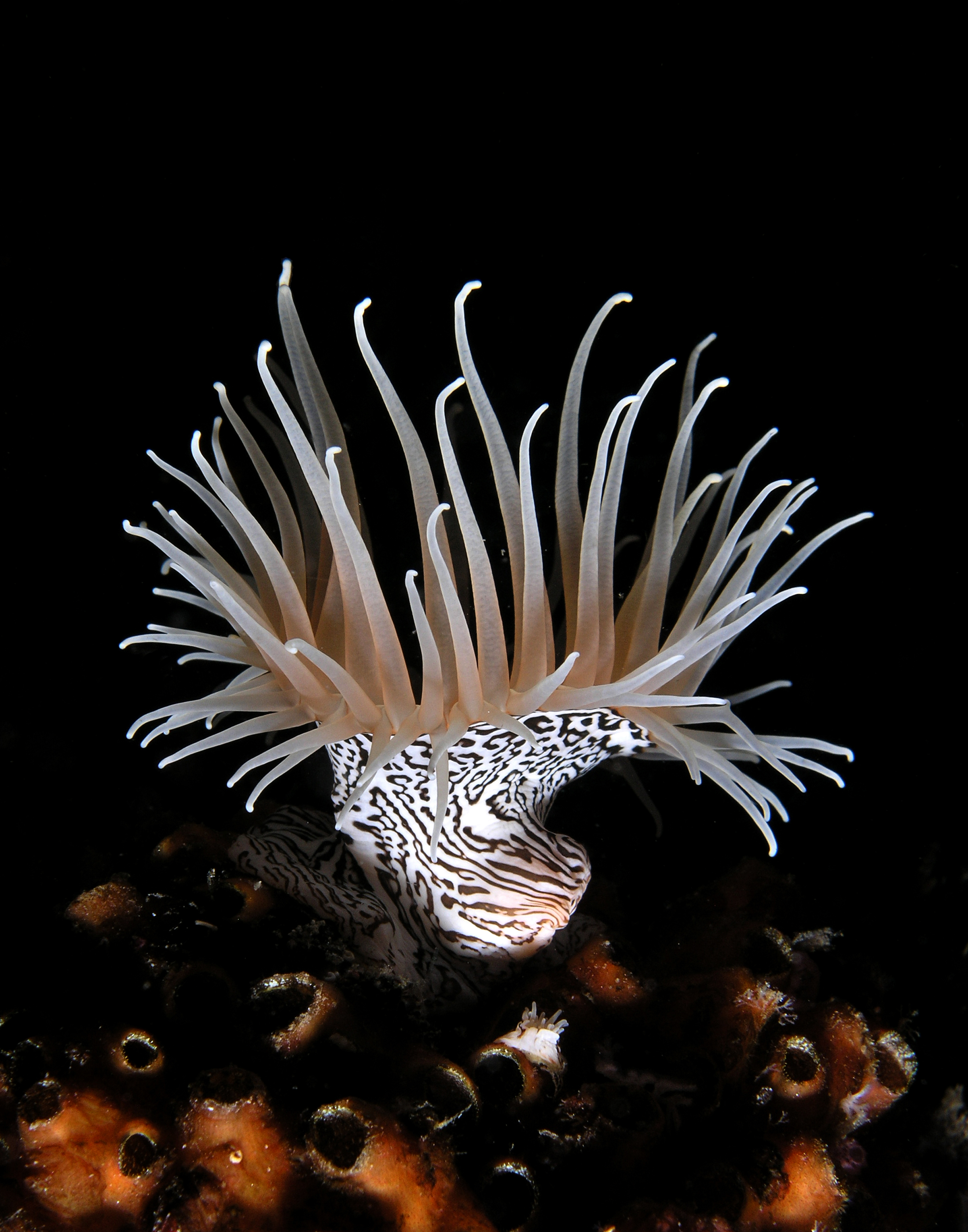
- Gorgonian wrapper sea anemone (Nemanthus annamensis)

Scientific classification
- Domain: Eukaryota
- Kingdom: Animalia
- Phylum: Cnidaria
- Subphylum: Anthozoa
- Class: Hexacorallia
- Order: Actiniaria
- Family: Nemanthidae; Carlgren, 1940
- Genus: Nemanthus

Synonyms
- Namanthus

= Nemanthus =

Genus of sea anemones

Nemanthus is a genus of sea anemones. It is the only genus in the monotypic family Nemanthidae.

== Species ==
The following species are recognized:

- Nemanthus annamensis Carlgren, 1943
- Nemanthus californicus Carlgren, 1940
- Nemanthus nitidus (Wassilieff, 1908)
