= Suberites dandelenae =

Scientific classification
- Kingdom: Animalia
- Phylum: Porifera
- Class: Demospongiae
- Order: Suberitida
- Family: Suberitidae
- Genus: Suberites
- Species: S. dandelenae

Binomial name
- Suberites dandelenae Samaai & Maduray, 2017

Species of sponge from southern Africa

Suberites dandelenae, the amorphous solid sponge, is a species of deep-sea demosponge from South Africa and Namibia.

== Description ==
This sponge is made up of rounded lobes. Each lobe has a distinct oscule on the top surface. Individual specimens can grow up to 40 cm (16 in) in length. It is yellow in colour and has a velvety surface. It breaks easily.

=== Spicules ===
Several morphologically similar species occur, but they differ at the spicule level. The following spicules are present in this species:

- Three distinct size classes of tylostyles (spicule with a point at one end and a knob at the other).
- Centrotylostongyles/oxeas (needle-shaped spicules with a sharp point at either end).
- Tylostrongyles (spicules that have a swollen end).
- Microacanthostrongyle (small spine covered spicules that have a rounded end).

== Distribution and habitat ==
This species is found off the west coast of southern Africa. It is known from the coasts of Namibia and South Africa, where it is found at depths of 80–500 m (260–1,640 ft). It is found on unconsolidated sediments such as sand.

== Ecology ==
This species grows in dense colonies. As much as 18 tons per square kilometer (6.95 tons per square mile) can be collected in a single demersal trawl off some areas of the South African coast. It is considered to be a potential indicator of a vulnerable marine ecosystem.
