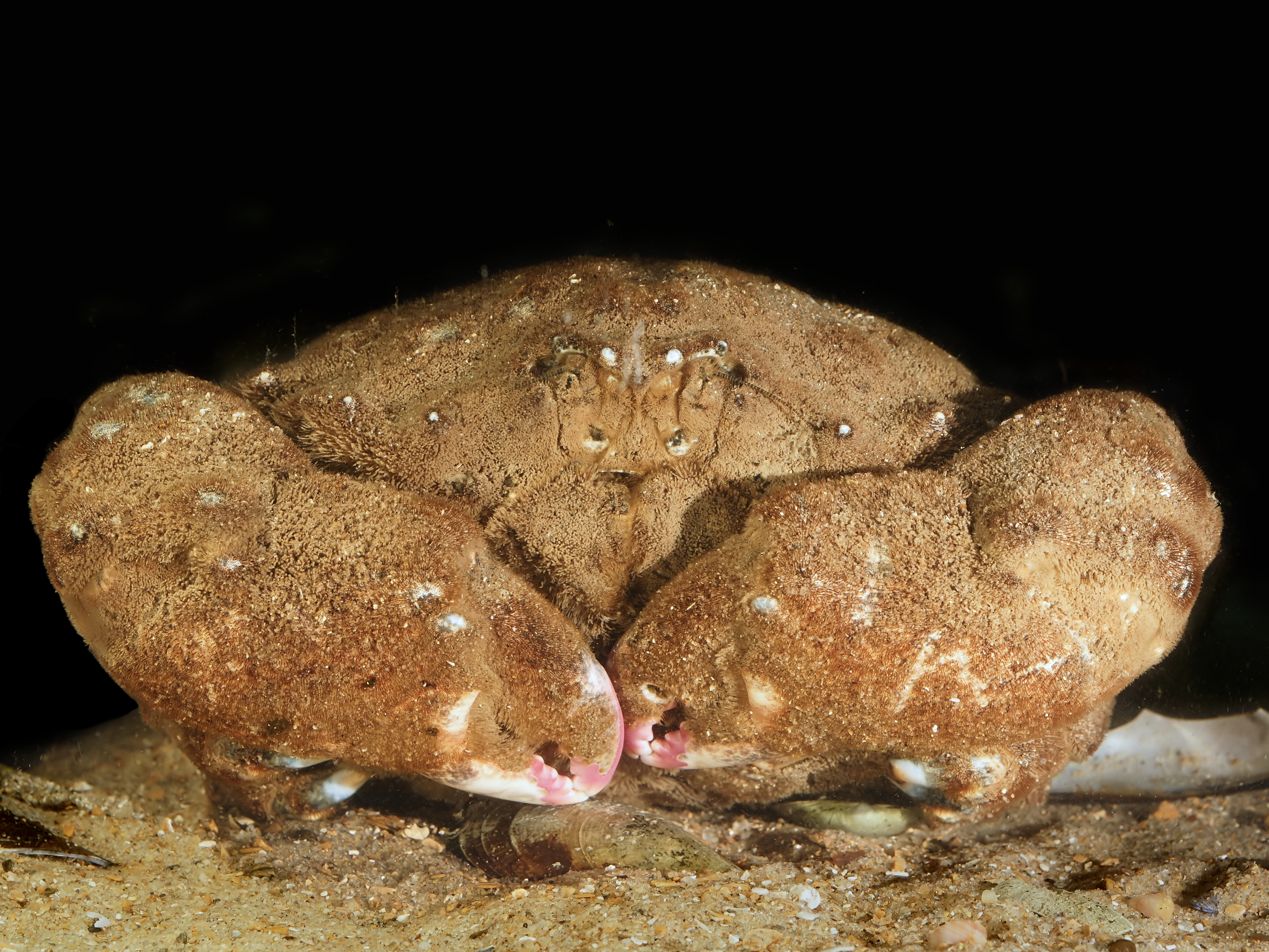

Scientific classification
- Kingdom: Animalia
- Phylum: Arthropoda
- Clade: Pancrustacea
- Class: Malacostraca
- Order: Decapoda
- Suborder: Pleocyemata
- Infraorder: Brachyura
- Family: Dromiidae
- Genus: Dromia
- Species: D. personata

Binomial name
- Dromia personata (Linnaeus, 1758)

Synonyms
- Cancer personatus Linnaeus, 1758; Cancer caputmortuum Linnaeus, 1767; Dromia clypeata Schousboe, 1802; Dromia vulgaris H. Milne-Edwards, 1837; Dromia communis Lucas, 1840; Dromia mediterranea Leach, 1875

= Dromia personata =

Species of crab

Dromia personata, also known as the sponge crab or sleepy crab, is a species of crab found in the North Sea, the Mediterranean Sea, and connecting parts of the northeastern Atlantic Ocean. Like most other epibenthic crustaceans, the biomass of this species is especially dense in the Mediterranean continental shelf. It mainly resides from the lower shore to a depth of 50 meters (164 ft), often in caves. Occasionally, they are found living in depths as low as 110 meters (360 ft). They serve as prey for octopus, starfish, and fish. Their last two pairs of legs are positioned dorsally, and are used to hold a sponge in place as camouflage.

== Reproduction and development ==
Dromia personata is a gonochoric species. Courtship prior to copulation is commonly practiced through visual, olfactory, or tactile means. Sperm can only be transferred directly from the male's gonopod into the ovigerous female after a molting period, when her exoskeleton has not hardened yet. Females store eggs in a pleopod and can also house sperm for up to nine months.

During development, the blastula forms three tissue layers: the ectoderm, mesoderm, and endoderm. The mesoderm tissue produces the coelom, which gives rise to the body cavity and specialized tissues and organs. Fertilized eggs hatch into larvae. These undergo four zoeal stages, followed by a megalopal stage, and finally an adult stage. With each molting period between these three phases, the crab gains new appendages while limbs that were formerly established become more specialized.

== Morphology ==
As an arthropod, D. personata is bilaterally symmetrical. The body is composed of a head, which contains the cephalon, and an elongated trunk, which consists of a thorax and abdomen. From the cephalon, there are two pairs of antennae and a mandible placed anteriorly, in addition to two pairs of maxillae positioned laterally. The trunk sprouts five pairs of walking legs, which are segmented medially to laterally: coxa, basis, ischium, merus, carpus, manus, and dactyl. The coxa, basis, ischium are smaller aspects that serve to attach the jointed limb to the crab's body.

The exoskeleton is composed of a chitin cuticle. This is periodically molted when the crab undergoes ecdysis. Following this shedding, other organisms or the crab itself will ingest the former shell to gain its nutrients. Most of D. personata's body is covered in tiny dark brown hairs that result in a smooth or velvet-like appearance. The only exception is its cheliped tips, which are typically white or light pink in color and hairless. These two chelipeds are large, equal in size and shape, and placed ventrally.

Typically, crabs have eight pereiopods that are utilized for swimming: the second, third, fourth, and fifth pairs of legs. However, D. personata only uses its second and third pairs for locomotion. These legs are long and stout. Meanwhile, it utilizes its remaining ambulatory legs, the fourth and fifth pairs, to hold sponges against the hairs of its dorsal cephalothorax. These legs are short, narrow, flat, and placed dorsally.

== Digestion ==
All decapods have an internal tube that transports food through the mouth, stomach, intestine, and anus. It is divided into three sections: the foregut, midgut, and hindgut.

The foregut is split into the cardiac foregut and pyloric foregut. They both contain ossicles, which serve the essential role of mastication. The cardiac foregut is defined by its sac-shaped structure, thin walls, prepterocardiac ossicle, and postpterocardiac ossicle. Meanwhile the pyloric foregut is characterized by its plates, lateral mesopyloric ossicle, and posterior uropyloric ossicle.

Previous studies and staining methods were unable to differentiate the calcified structures. However, recent research completed with Alizarin Red S staining has allowed them to be described with correct terminology, and for comparative analyses to be completed between decapod crustacean species to determine their phylogenetic relationships.

== Relationship with sponges ==
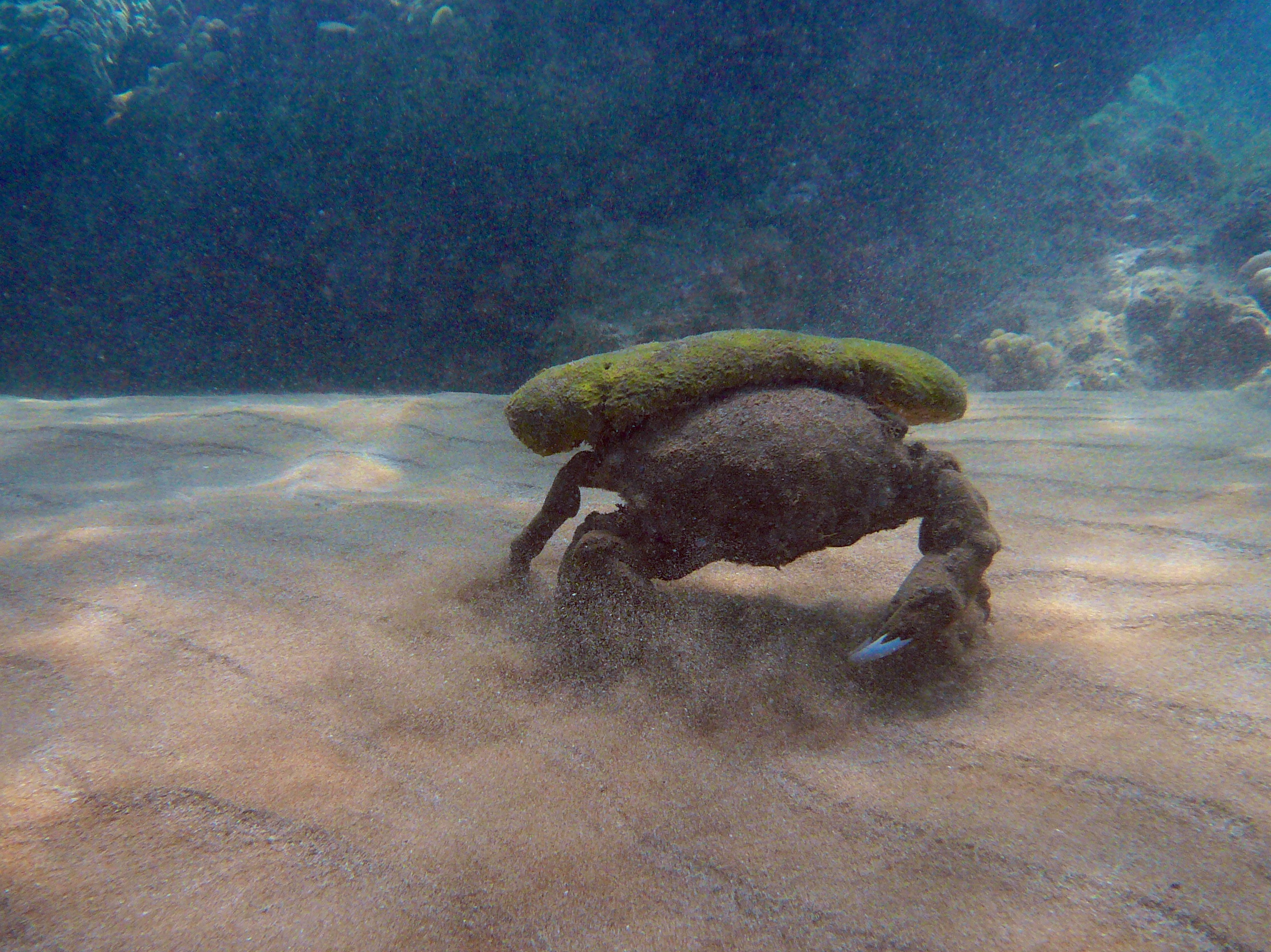
D. personata supporting a sponge on its back with its four dorsoposterior legs while walking with the other pereiopods

Dromia personata is known for adhering a sponge to its back. The two organisms have a symbiotic relationship where the crab is able to camouflage while providing the sponge with physical protection from predators, such as fish, turtles, and sea slugs. The crab prefers Halichondria panicea, Celtodoryx ciocalyptoides, and sponges of the Suberites genus. Upon obtaining a sponge, either when molding its first sponge or obtaining a new one following a period of molting, the fourth and fifth pairs of pereiopods tear the sponge from its edges until it is a spherical size and shape. These same legs support the sponge on the crab's back. As it grows, the sponge conforms to mimic the cephalothorax shape.

Dromia personata has exhibited protective behavior for its sponge. When another organism attempts to eat or steal its sponge, the host crab attacks with its chelae. When concealed within a mass of other sponges, the crab is able to identify the sponge it most recently claimed. In addition, it surpasses considerable physical challenges, such as lifting rocks, in order to retrieve its sponge.
