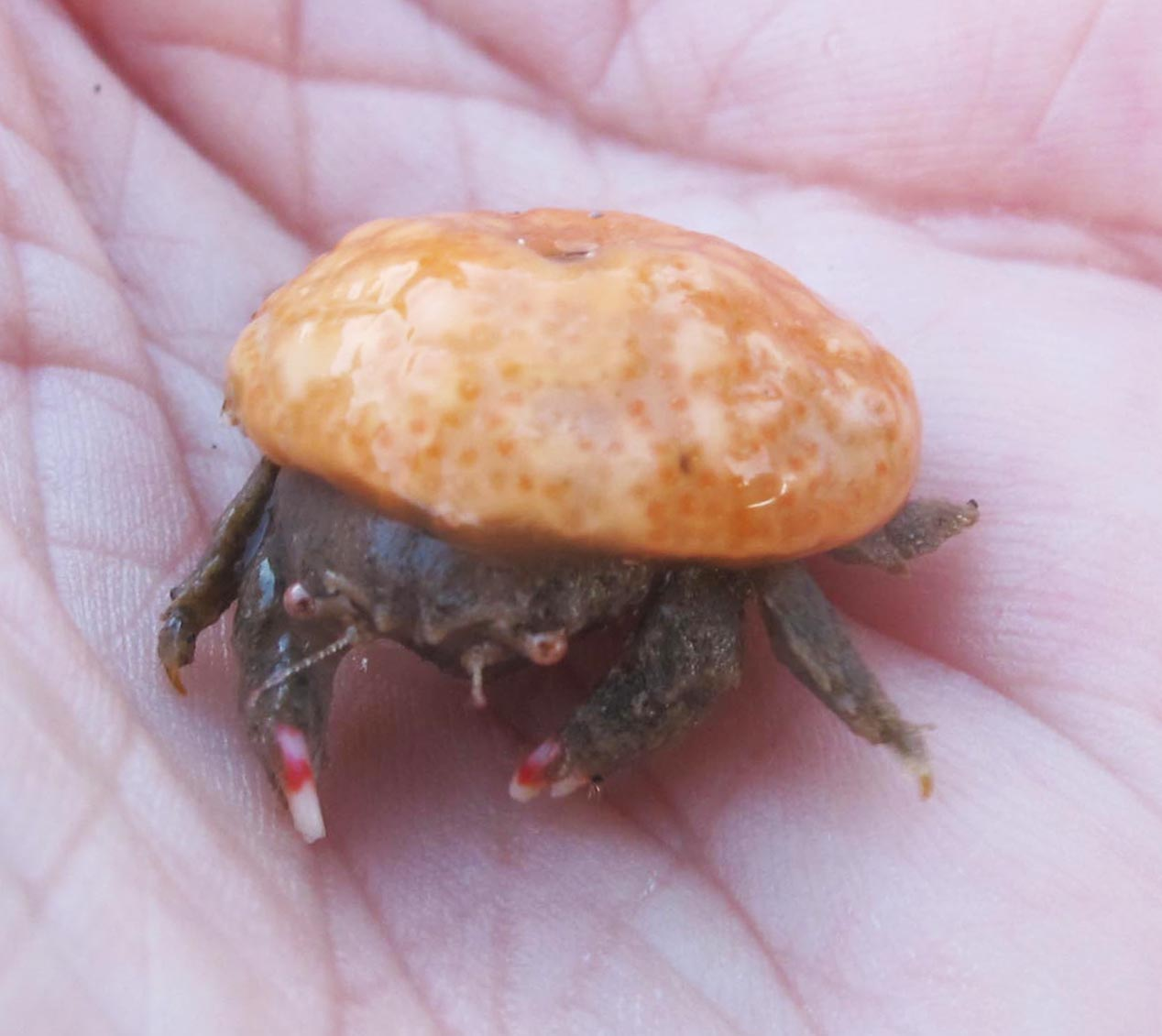
- Moreiradromia antillensis from a tidepool on the island of Nevis
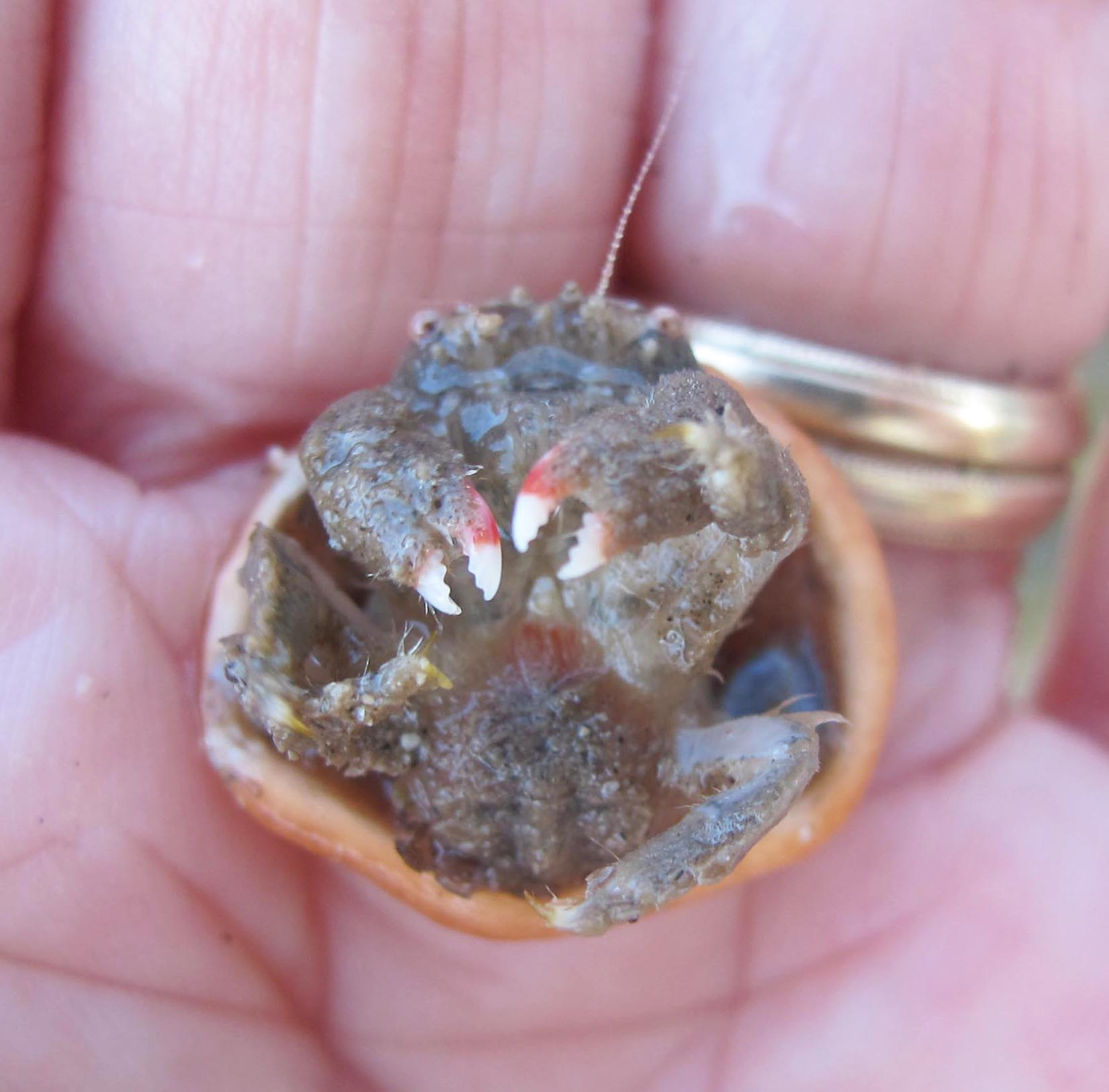
- Ventral view of same crab

Scientific classification
- Domain: Eukaryota
- Kingdom: Animalia
- Phylum: Arthropoda
- Class: Malacostraca
- Order: Decapoda
- Suborder: Pleocyemata
- Infraorder: Brachyura
- Family: Dromiidae
- Genus: Moreiradromia; Guinot & Tavares, 2003

= Moreiradromia =

Genus of crabs

Moreiradromia is a genus of sponge crabs in the family Dromiidae.

== Species ==
Species within this genus include:

- Moreiradromia antillensis (Stimpson, 1858)
- Moreiradromia sarraburei (Rathbun, 1910)
