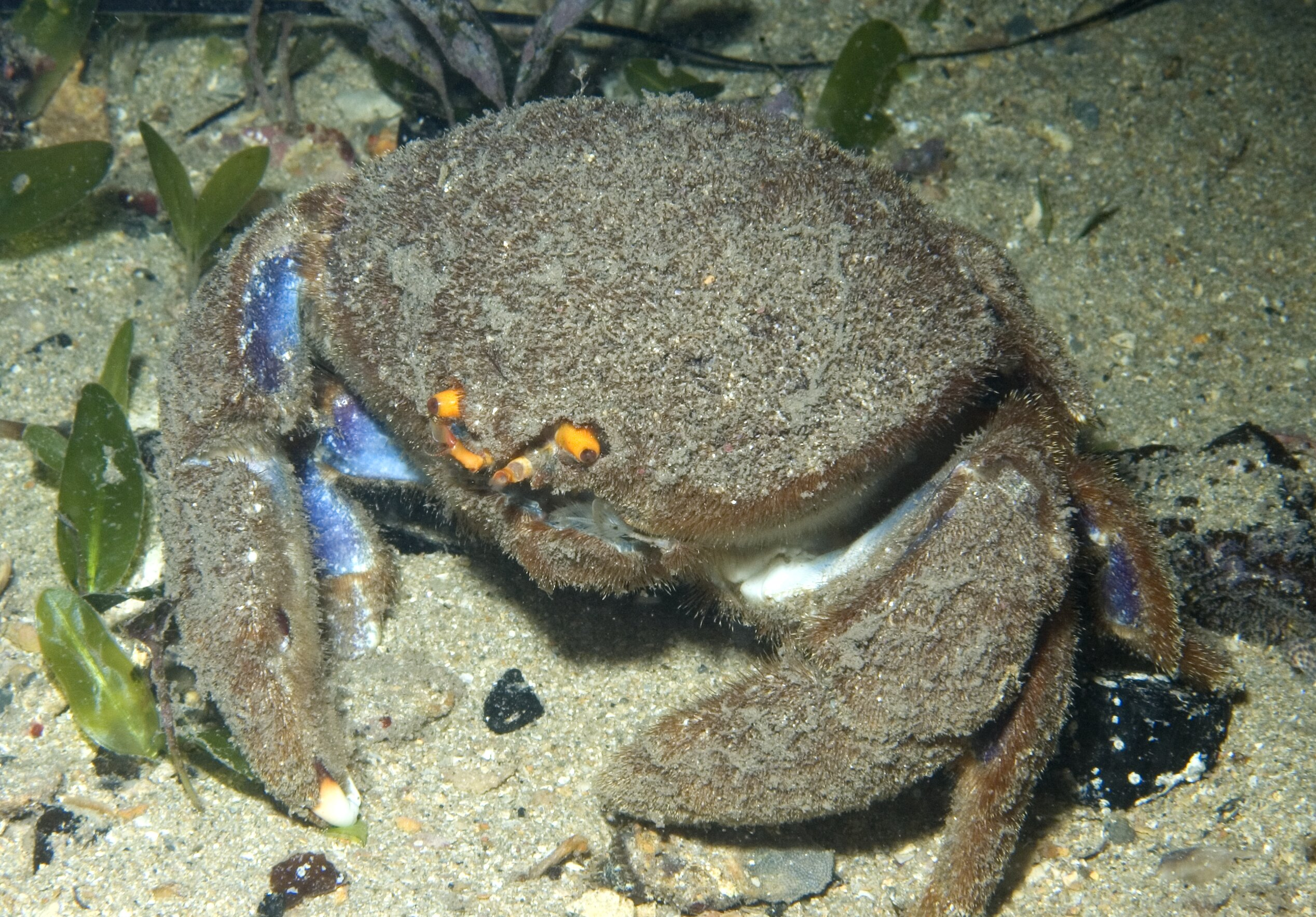
- Austrodromidia octodentata

Scientific classification
- Domain: Eukaryota
- Kingdom: Animalia
- Phylum: Arthropoda
- Class: Malacostraca
- Order: Decapoda
- Suborder: Pleocyemata
- Infraorder: Brachyura
- Family: Dromiidae
- Genus: Austrodromidia; McLay, 1993

Type species
- Dromidia australis Rathbun, 1923

= Austrodromidia =

Genus of crabs

Austrodromidia is a genus of crabs within the family Dromiidae. There are currently 5 species designated to the genus, with the type species being Austrodromidia australis.

== Species ==
- Austrodromidia aegagropila (Fabricius, 1787)
- Austrodromidia australis (Rathbun, 1923)
- Austrodromidia incisa (Henderson, 1888)
- Austrodromidia insignis (Rathbun, 1923)
- Austrodromidia octodentata (Haswell, 1882)
