= Suberites ficus =

Scientific classification
- Kingdom: Animalia
- Phylum: Porifera
- Class: Demospongiae
- Order: Suberitida
- Family: Suberitidae
- Genus: Suberites
- Species: S. ficus

Binomial name
- Suberites ficus (Johnston, 1842)

Synonyms
- List: Alcyonium ficus sensu Linnaeus, 1767; Alcyonium ficus sensu Pallas, 1766; Choanites ficus (Johnston, 1842); Ficulina ficus (Johnston, 1842); Halichondria farinaria Bowerbank, 1866; Halichondria ficus Johnston, 1842; Hymeniacidon ficus (sensu Linnaeus, 1767); Suberites domuncula var. ficus (Johnston, 1842)

Species of sponge in the family Suberitidae

Suberites ficus is a species of sponge in the family Suberitidae. It is sometimes known as the fig sponge or orange sponge.

== Taxonomy ==
The name "ficus" was first used by Pallas in 1766 for Alcyonium ficus but it is unclear exactly which animal he was describing and it is now thought that it may have been an ascidian. Linnaeus in 1767, Esper in 1794 and Lamarck in 1814 also used the name but it was not until Johnston described the spicules as well as the sponge which he named Halichondria ficus in 1842 that it became clear what sponge was being described. Further research needs to be undertaken to clarify the position. Suberites suberia was at one time thought to be a synonym but molecular analysis has shown that it is a distinct species. Suberites farinaria is a similar but encrusting sponge but it is thought to be a juvenile form of S. ficus. Another species, Suberites virgultosa, used to be considered a synonym but is now considered a valid species in its own right. Suberites domuncula may also be synonymous and further study is required.

== Description ==
S. ficus is a large sponge growing up to thirty or forty centimetres across. It is usually some shade of orange or red, especially in brightly lit places, but sometimes is greyish or brownish in dimmer locations. The shape is irregular and varies, sometimes being lobose, sometimes cushion-like and sometimes encrusting. It has a smooth-looking surface but this feels rough to the touch. There are a small number of large oscules, mostly towards the top of the sponge.

On microscopic examination it can be seen that the megascleres are in two sizes, one twice as large as the other. There are very few microscleres, and these are one tenth of the size of the megascleres. The skeleton is composed of spicules arranged radially near the surface, but chaotically in the interior. There may be gemmules near the base of the sponge.

== Distribution ==
S. ficus is found in the Atlantic Ocean as well as in the Mediterranean Sea. It is widely distributed around the shores of the British Isles especially the western coasts.

== Habitat ==
S. ficus is found growing on rocks from the lower shore down to a depth of two hundred metres and prefers locations with strong tidal flows. It often grows among seaweed and is also found on harbour structures and wreckage. When it grows on a stone or an empty gastropod or bivalve shell it may completely engulf it. It sometimes grows on a shell housing a living hermit crab.

== Biology ==
Members of this genus are generally hermaphrodites. The male and female gametes may not be released simultaneously and sperm may be drawn into the vascular system of another individual. Fertilisation is internal and the ciliated larvae are liberated into the water column and become part of the zooplankton. Asexual reproduction also takes place, either by budding or through the development of gemmules. These are "survival pods" and remain dormant under normal conditions. They can become active when a period of adverse conditions such as an excessive exposure to low temperatures comes to an end.

== Ecology ==
S. ficus does not have many predators. This may be because it has an unpleasant odour or because the spicules make it unpalatable. It is eaten however by some marine gastropods and some nudibranchs. In Cape Cod Bay, it forms part of the diet of the Atlantic bluefin tuna (Thunnus thynnus).

When the sponge grows on a shell occupied by a hermit crab there may be mutual advantages to both. The sponge benefits from the crab's ability to move away from predators such as nudibranchs, while the crab may benefit from the sponge's unpalatability and the camouflage it provides.

S. ficus ssp. rubrus has been investigated as a possible source of antibiotics, anti-fouling, and other biologically active compounds because it was noticed that when the shells of cultivated scallops, family Pectinidae, were host to this sponge, no other invertebrates fouled the shells.
