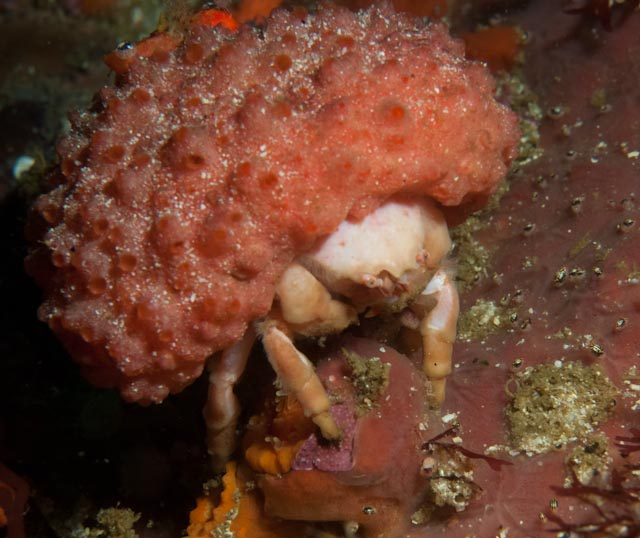

Scientific classification
- Kingdom: Animalia
- Phylum: Arthropoda
- Clade: Pancrustacea
- Class: Malacostraca
- Order: Decapoda
- Suborder: Pleocyemata
- Infraorder: Brachyura
- Family: Dromiidae
- Genus: Pseudodromia
- Species: P. latens

Binomial name
- Pseudodromia latens Stimpson, 1858

= Furred sponge crab =

Species of crab

The furred sponge crab, Pseudodromia latens, is a species of crab in the family Dromiidae, often referred to as sponge crabs.

== Description ==
This sponge crab grows up to 50 millimetres (2.0 in) across its carapace and has a puffy body covered with a fine fur. It may be yellow or cream and has knobbly tips to its legs, It carries a cloak of sponge or ascidians on its back, probably for camouflage.

== Distribution ==
This crab is found from the Namibian border and around the South African coast to Sodwana Bay subtidally and to at least 18 m underwater. It is also found in the Indian Ocean.

== Ecology ==
This crab cuts a piece of sponge or ascidian from a colony and holds it on its back using its fifth pair of legs which are specially bent upwards for this purpose. The crab gains protection in the form of camouflage and the deterrent provided by the toxins of the animals it carries. The covering grows to almost completely cover the crab.
