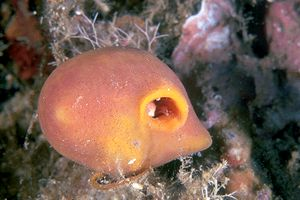
- Suberites domuncula

Scientific classification
- Kingdom: Animalia
- Phylum: Porifera
- Class: Demospongiae
- Order: Suberitida
- Family: Suberitidae
- Genus: Suberites; Nardo, 1833

Species
- See text

Synonyms
- List: Carnleia Burton, 1930; Choanites Mantell, 1822 sensu De Laubenfels, 1936; Ficulina Gray, 1867; Laxosuberella Burton, 1930; Litamena Nardo, 1833; Lithumena Renier, 1828; Raspailia (Syringella) sensu Schmidt, 1868; Suberanthus Lendenfeld, 1898; Suberella Thiele, 1905; Suberella Burton, 1929; Syringella Schmidt, 1868

= Suberites =

Genus of sponges

Suberites is a genus of sea sponges in the family Suberitidae. Sponges, known scientifically as Porifera, are the oldest metazoans and are used to elucidate the basics of multicellular evolution. These living fossils are ideal for studying the principal features of metazoans, such as extracellular matrix interactions, signal-receptor systems, nervous or sensory systems, and primitive immune systems. Thus, sponges are useful tools with which to study early animal evolution. They appeared approximately 580 million years ago, in the Ediacaran.

== Evolutionary significance ==
Because sponges have historically been thought to form the sister group to all other metazoan lineages, Suberites have been used as model organisms to elucidate features of the earliest animals. For example, Suberites and their relatives have been studied in an attempt to ascertain how totipotency was replaced by pluripotency in most non-sponge animals. Among other things, studies of Suberites have been interpreted as showing that tyrosine-phosphorylation machinery evolved in animals independently from other eukaryotes. Suberites are also used as models to elucidate the evolution of transmembrane receptors and cell-junction proteins. However, evidence increasingly suggests that ctenophores, not sponges, are the sister group to all other metazoan animals, suggesting that these studies may need to be reinterpreted in light of this new evidence.

== Ecology ==
Suberites are a global genus. One species, Suberites zeteki, is found in Hawaii. S. zeteki associates with many fungi. Another, S. japonicas, is native to the waters around Japan. S. aurantiacus is found in the Caribbean sea. S. carnosus lives in the Indian Ocean and in the Mediterranean Sea and can also be found in Irish waters. S. diversicolor can be found in Indonesia. Due to Suberites' ability to efficiently filter water, many microbes, especially fungal species, are filtered through. If these microbes escape digestion, they can deposit on the sponge and reside there indefinitely. Symbiotic bacteria produce toxins, such as okadaic acid, which defend them from colonization by parasitic annelids. Expression of various enzymes by Suberites influences the growth of their symbiotic bacteria. Suberites often live on the shells on the mollusk Hexaplex trunculus. Suberites have mechanisms of defense against predation, such as the toxic chemicals found below.

== Physiology ==
Suberites display neuronal communications, but neuronal networks are mysteriously missing. However, they do have many of the same sensory receptors and signals found in non-sponge animals. Researchers in China and Germany have found that sponge spicules contribute to their neural communication. In effect, the silicaceous structures act as fiber optic cables to convey light signals generated from the protein luciferase. The sponges generate light from luciferin, after it is acted upon by luciferase. Suberites have also been shown to produce light in response to tactile stimulation. Suberites consist mostly of cells, in contrast with other Porifera (such as the class Hexactinellida) which are syncytial. As a result, Suberites have slower reaction times in their neural communication. Suberites utilized many Ras-like GTPases which are used for signaling and affect development. According to comparative studies, Suberites have some of the most simple indicator proteins, such as collagen, of known animals. Like all sponges, Suberites are filter-feeders. They are extremely efficient and can process thousands of liters of water per day. S. domuncula has been used for study of graft rejection. Researchers have discovered that apoptotic factors are induced in the tissue that is rejected.

== Development ==
Suberites consist of many telomerase-positive cells, which means the cells are essentially immortal, barring cell death signal. In most cases, the signal is a lack of connection either to the extracellular matrix or other cells. Their apoptotic cells are similar to homologous to mammalian. However, maintenance of long-lived cells involves proteins such as SDLAGL that are highly similar to yeast and human homologs. Certain inorganic materials, such as iron and selenium, influence the growth of Suberites, including the primmorph growth and spicule formation. Suberites undergo cell differentiation through a variety of mechanisms based on cell-cell communication.

== Morphology ==
Suberites are key examples of the importance of the extracellular matrix in animals. In sponges, it is mediated by proteoglycans. Spicule formation is also important for Suberites. Spicules are structural support of sponges, similar to skeletons in vertebrates. They are normally hollow structures that are formed by lamellar growth. Whereas vertebrate animal skeletons are largely calcium-based, sponge spicules consist mostly of silica, a silicon dioxide polymer. These inorganic structures provide support for the animals. The spicules are biologically-formed silica structures, also known as biosilica. Silica deposition begins intracellularly and is carried out by the enzyme silicatein. Silicateins are modulated by a group of proteins called silintaphins. The process occurs in specialized cells known as sclerocytes. Biosilica formation in Suberites differs from other species that utilize biosilica in this regard. Most other species, such as certain plants and diatoms, simply deposit a supersaturated biosilica solution. The network of silica found in sponges mediates much of the sponges' neural communications.

== Immunity and defense ==
Suberites show the cytokine-like molecule allograft inflammatory factor one (AIF-1), which is similar to vertebrate AIF-1. Immune response relies on phosphorylation cascades involving the p38 kinase. S. domuncula was the first demonstrated immune response of invertebrate species (1). These sponges also have similar graft-response inflammation to vertebrates. Their immune systems are much simpler than vertebrates; they consist of only innate immunity. Because they filter thousands of liters of water per day, and their environment contains a high concentration of bacteria and viruses, Suberites have developed a highly potent system of immunity. Despite the efficiency of their immune systems, Suberites can be susceptible to infection which often stimulates cell death through apoptotic pathways.

Suberites, namely S. domuncula, defend themselves from macroscopic threats with a neurotoxin known as suberitine. It was the first known protein discovered in a sponge. The neurotoxic properties of suberitine arise from its ability to block action potentials. It additionally has hemolytic properties, which do not originate from phospholipase A activity. It has some antibacterial activity; however, the extent of the activity due solely to suberitine is not currently defined. The sponge itself neutralizes the toxin through a pathway that is not fully understood, but involves retinal, a β-carotene metabolite. S. japonicas also produces several cytotoxic compounds, seragamides A-F. The seragamides act by interfering with cytoskeleton activity, specifically the actin microfilaments. The activity of the seragamides is a possible route for anti-cancer drugs, similar to existing drugs which target microtubules. Suberites also produce cytotoxic compounds known as nakijinamines, which resemble other toxins found in Suberites, but the role of the nakijinamines has not yet been found. Many of the bioactive compounds found on Suberites are microbial in nature.

== Species ==
The following species are recognised in the genus Suberites:

- Suberites affinis Brøndsted, 1923
- Suberites anastomosus Brøndsted, 1924
- Suberites aurantiacus (Duchassaing & Michelotti, 1864)
- Suberites australiensis Bergquist, 1968
- Suberites axiatus Ridley & Dendy, 1886
- Suberites axinelloides Brøndsted, 1924
- Suberites baffini Brøndsted, 1933
- Suberites bengalensis Lévi, 1964
- Suberites caminatus Ridley & Dendy, 1886
- Suberites carnosus (Johnston, 1842)
- Suberites cebriones Morozov, Sabirov & Zimina, 2019
- Suberites clavatus Keller, 1891
- Suberites concinnus Lambe, 1895
- Suberites cranium Hajdu et al, 2013
- Suberites crelloides Marenzeller, 1886
- Suberites crispolobatus Lambe, 1895
- Suberites cupuloides Bergquist, 1961
- Suberites dandelenae Samaai & Maduray, 2017
- Suberites difficilis Dendy, 1897
- Suberites distortus Schmidt, 1870
- Suberites diversicolor Becking & Lim 2009
- Suberites domuncula (Olivi, 1792)
- Suberites excellens (Thiele, 1898)
- Suberites ficus (Johnston, 1842)
- Suberites flabellatus Carter, 1886
- Suberites gibbosiceps Topsent, 1904
- Suberites glaber Hansen, 1885
- Suberites glasenapii Merejkowski, 1879
- Suberites globosus Carter, 1886
- Suberites heros Schmidt, 1870
- Suberites hirsutus Topsent, 1927
- Suberites holgeri Van Soest & Hooper, 2020
- Suberites hystrix Schmidt, 1868
- Suberites insignis Carter, 1886
- Suberites japonicus Thiele, 1898
- Suberites kelleri Burton, 1930
- Suberites lambei Austin et al., 2014
- Suberites laticeps Topsent, 1904
- Suberites latus Lambe, 1893
- Suberites lobatus (Wilson, 1902)
- Suberites luna Giraldes & Goodwin, 2020
- Suberites luridus Solé-Cava & Thorpe, 1986
- Suberites lutea Sole-Cava & Thorpe, 1986
- Suberites mammilaris Sim & Kim, 1994
- Suberites massa Nardo, 1847
- Suberites microstomus Ridley & Dendy, 1887
- Suberites mineri (de Laubenfels, 1935)
- Suberites mollis Ridley & Dendy, 1886
- Suberites montalbidus Carter, 1880
- Suberites pagurorum Solé-Cava & Thorpe, 1986
- Suberites paradoxus Wilson, 1931
- Suberites perfectus Ridley & Dendy, 1886
- Suberites pisiformis Lévi, 1993
- Suberites placenta Thiele, 1898
- Suberites prototypus Czerniavsky, 1880
- Suberites puncturatus Thiele, 1905
- Suberites purpura Fortunato, Pérez & Lôbo-Hajdu, 2020
- Suberites radiatus Kieschnick, 1896
- Suberites ramosus Brøndsted, 1924
- Suberites rhaphidiophorus (Brøndsted, 1924)
- Suberites ruber Thiele, 1905
- Suberites rubrus Sole-Cava & Thorpe, 1986
- Suberites senilis Ridley & Dendy, 1886
- Suberites sericeus Thiele, 1898
- Suberites spermatozoon (Schmidt, 1875)
- Suberites spirastrelloides Dendy, 1897
- Suberites spongiosus Schmidt, 1868
- Suberites stilensis Burton, 1933
- Suberites strongylatus Sarà, 1978
- Suberites suberia (Montagu, 1818)
- Suberites syringella (Schmidt, 1868)
- Suberites topsenti (Burton, 1929)
- Suberites tortuosus Lévi, 1959
- Suberites tylobtusus Lévi, 1958
- Suberites verrilli Van Soest & Hooper, 2020
- Suberites virgultosus (Johnston, 1842)
