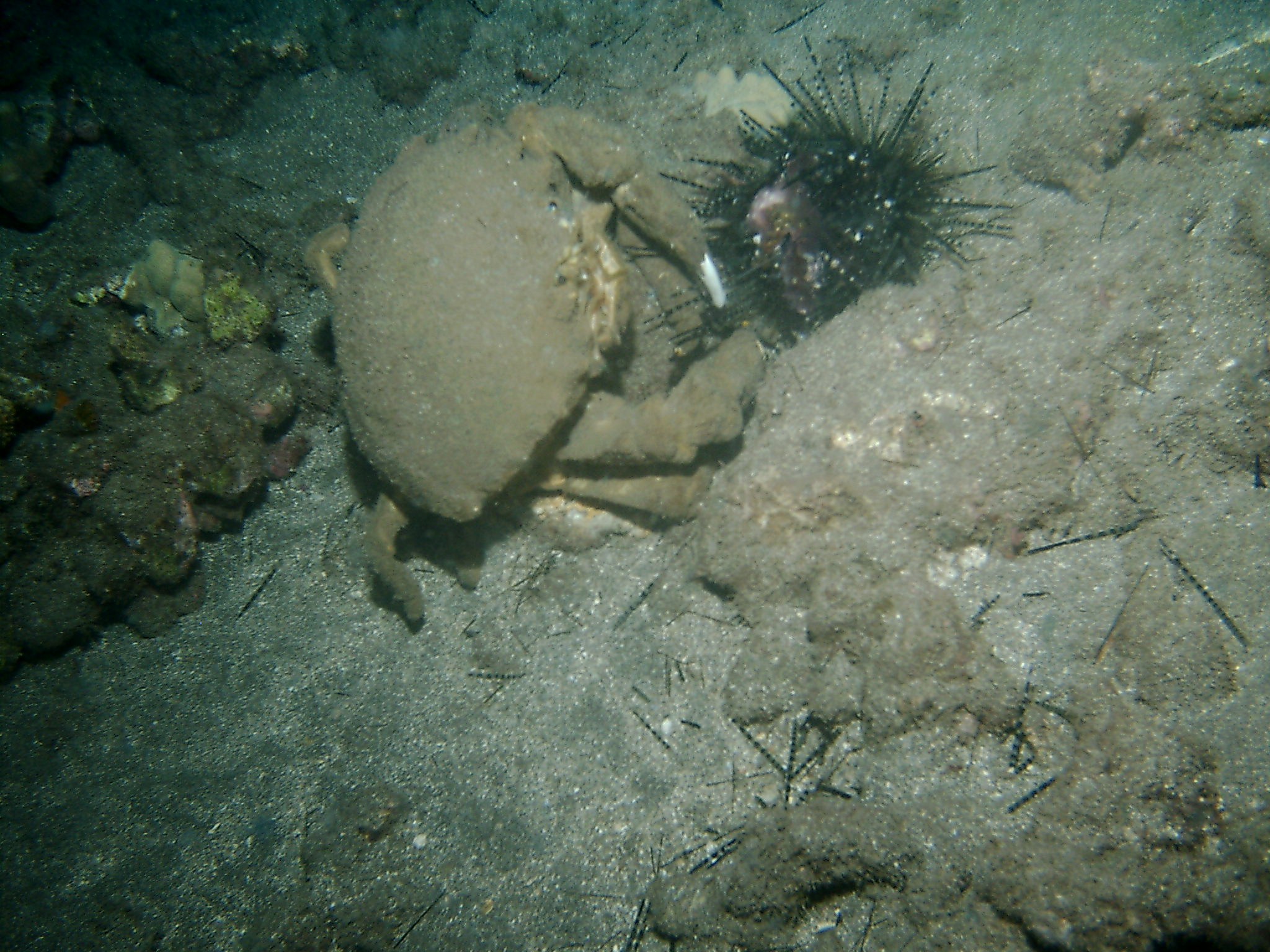
- Dromia dormia (Dromioidea: Dromiidae) feeding on a sea urchin

Scientific classification
- Kingdom: Animalia
- Phylum: Arthropoda
- Class: Malacostraca
- Order: Decapoda
- Suborder: Pleocyemata
- Infraorder: Brachyura
- Section: Podotremata; Guinot, 1977

Superfamilies
- 5; see text

= Podotremata =

Group of crabs

Podotremata is a traditionally used section of crabs (Brachyura), now considered to be invalid. It was the smaller grouping of crabs, separate from the larger Eubrachyura section. Morphological and molecular analyses do not reveal a monophyletic Podotremata, but rather that it is paraphyletic, and so the most recent classifications divide "Podotremata" into three sections: Dromiacea, Cyclodorippoidea and Raninoida.

This group contains the following superfamilies (with their current sections indicated in parentheses):

- Cyclodorippoidea (Cyclodorippoida)
- Homolodromioidea (Dromiacea)
- Dromioidea (Dromiacea)
- Homoloidea (Dromiacea)
- Raninoidea (Raninoida)

Here is a cladogram showing the placement of the former members of Podetremata (highlighted in bold) within Brachyura:

- Brachyura
  - **Dromiacea**
  - - - **Raninoida**
      - **Cyclodorippoida**
    - Eubrachyura
      - Heterotremata
      - Thoracotremata
