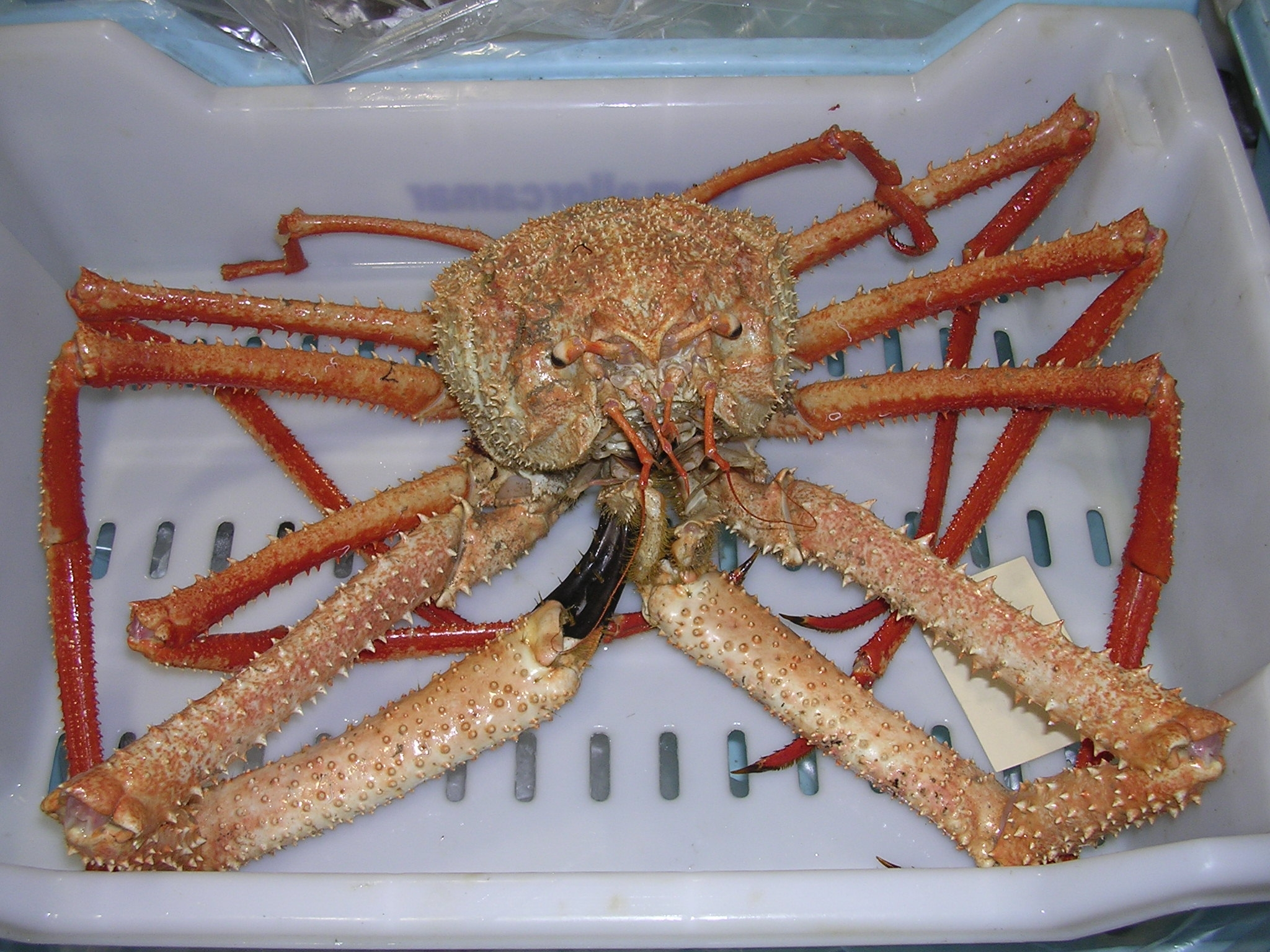
- Paromola cuvieri

Scientific classification
- Kingdom: Animalia
- Phylum: Arthropoda
- Class: Malacostraca
- Order: Decapoda
- Suborder: Pleocyemata
- Infraorder: Brachyura
- Section: Dromiacea
- Superfamily: Homoloidea; De Haan, 1839

Families
- Homolidae; Latreilliidae; Poupiniidae

= Homoloidea =

Homoloidea Temporal range: Late Jurassic–Recent

Superfamily of crabs

Homoloidea is a superfamily of dromiacean crabs. Homoloidea belongs the group Dromiacea, taxonomically ranked as a section, and is the sister group to Dromioidea. Dromiacea is the most basal grouping of Brachyura crabs, and likely diverged from the rest of Brachyura around the Late Triassic or Early Jurassic. The close relation between Homoloidea and Dromioidea is primarily established through ultrastructural characteristics of the sperm.

The below cladogram shows Homoloidea's placement within Dromiacea:

- Dromiacea
  - Dromioidea
    - Dromiidae (may be paraphyletic)
    - Dynomenidae
  - Homoloidea
    - Homolidae (paraphyletic)
    - Latreilliidae

Recent studies have found that the Homoloidea family Homolidae is paraphyletic with respect to Latreilliidae.

== See also ==
- Homola barbata
