= Homola =

Homola (Czech/Slovak feminine: Homolová) is a Czech and Slovak surname. The surname may refer to:

- Bedřich Homola (1887–1943), Czech general
- Bernard Homola (1894–1975), German film score composer
- Craig Homola (born 1958), American ice hockey player
- Irena Homola-Skąpska (1929–2017), Polish historian
- Jiří Homola (born 1980), Czech footballer
- Mária Homolová (born 1987), Slovak gymnast
- Matěj Homola (born 1973), Czech musician
- Maťo Homola (born 1994), Slovak racing driver
- Susan Homola, American politician

== See also ==
- Homola barbata, species of crab
