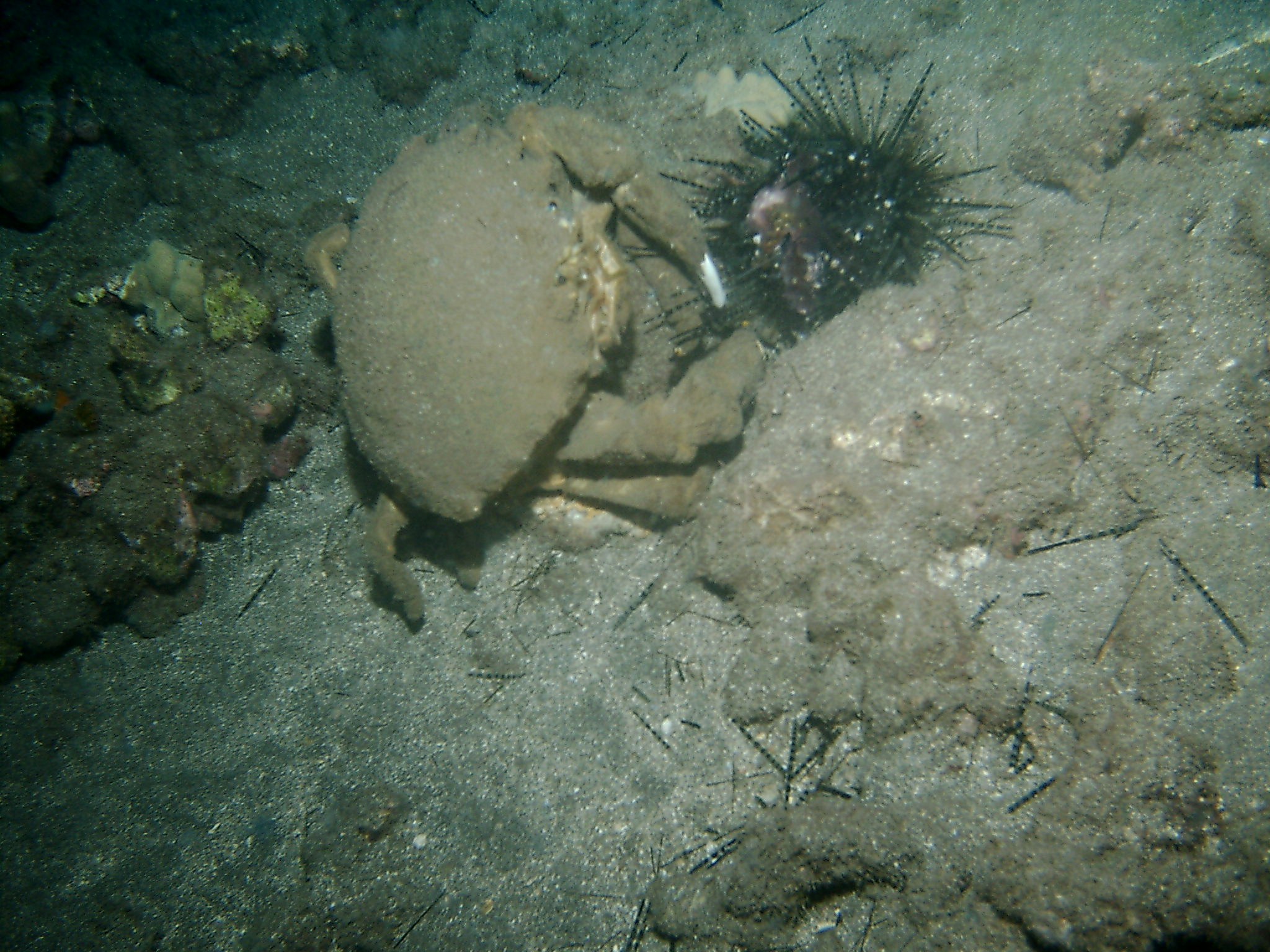
- Dromia dormia (Dromioidea: Dromiidae) feeding on a sea urchin

Scientific classification
- Kingdom: Animalia
- Phylum: Arthropoda
- Clade: Pancrustacea
- Class: Malacostraca
- Order: Decapoda
- Suborder: Pleocyemata
- Infraorder: Brachyura
- Section: Dromiacea; De Haan, 1833

Superfamilies
- Dakoticancroidea †; Dromioidea; Glaessneropsoidea †; Homolodromioidea; Homoloidea

= Dromiacea =

Dromiacea Temporal range: Jurassic–Recent

Group of crabs

Dromiacea is a group of crabs, ranked as a section. It contains 240 extant and nearly 300 extinct species. Dromiacea is the most basal grouping of Brachyura crabs, diverging the earliest in the evolutionary history, around the Late Triassic or Early Jurassic. Below is a cladogram showing Dromiacea's placement within Brachyura:

- Brachyura
  - Dromiacea
  - - - Raninoida
      - Cyclodorippoida
    - Eubrachyura
      - Heterotremata
      - Thoracotremata

The larvae of Dromiacea resemble those of the Anomura more closely than those of other crabs. This may simply reflect their basal position in the crab phylogeny.

The superfamily Eocarcinoidea, containing Eocarcinus and Platykotta, was previously considered to be a member of the Dromiacea, but was transferred to the Anomura according to a 2011 study. However, a reanalysis in 2020 found it to be the earliest known stem-group crab within Brachyura.

The fossil record of Dromiacea reaches back at least as far as the Jurassic, and, if Imocaris is indeed a member, into the Carboniferous.

Dromiacea primarily consists of two groups of superfamilies - Dromioidea and Homoloidea. See the below cladogram:

- Dromiacea
  - Dromioidea
    - Dromiidae (may be paraphyletic)
    - Dynomenidae
  - Homoloidea
    - Homolidae (paraphyletic)
    - Latreilliidae

Recent studies have found that some of the families may not be monophyletic, but rather paraphyletic.

- The Dromioidea family Dromiidae may be paraphyletic with respect to Dynomenidae
- The Homoloidea family Homolidae is paraphyletic with respect to Latreilliidae
