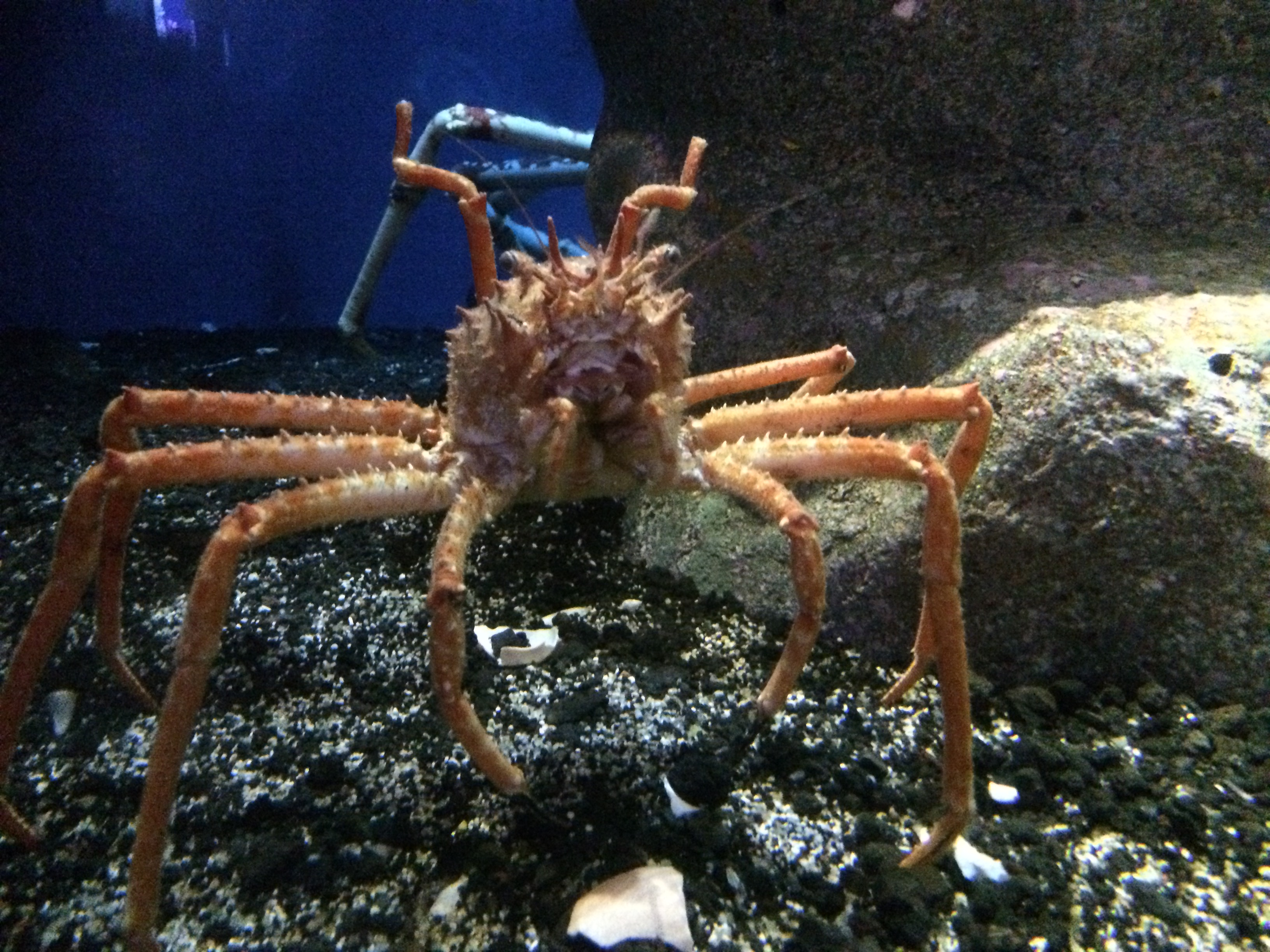

Scientific classification
- Kingdom: Animalia
- Phylum: Arthropoda
- Clade: Pancrustacea
- Class: Malacostraca
- Order: Decapoda
- Suborder: Pleocyemata
- Infraorder: Brachyura
- Family: Homolidae
- Genus: Paromola
- Species: P. japonica

Binomial name
- Paromola japonica Parisi, 1915

= Paromola japonica =

Species of crab

Paromola japonica, the Japanese deepwater carrier crab, is a species of crab in the family Homolidae. It has been found in Hawaii, Indonesia, Japan and to Vietnam at depths of 150–250 m (490–820 ft).

== Description ==
Paromola japonica has an orange-red to white in colour, with a robust carapace, reaching a carapace length of 180 mm (7.1 in). It is covered by small, sharp spinules, which vary in size. Its chelipeds reaches exceeding slightly as the carapace. The fifth pair of legs (which is in the back of the carapace) are not produced and the dactylus curved. It carries corals and sponges, for camouflage.
