= Gordonopsis mazupo =

Scientific classification
- Kingdom: Animalia
- Phylum: Arthropoda
- Clade: Pancrustacea
- Class: Malacostraca
- Order: Decapoda
- Suborder: Pleocyemata
- Infraorder: Brachyura
- Family: Homolidae
- Genus: Gordonopsis
- Species: G. mazupo

Binomial name
- Gordonopsis mazupo Ng & Liu, 2024

Species of crab

Gordonopsis mazupo is a species of deep sea crab. It was discovered in the South China Sea in 2021 and described as a new species in 2024.

== Discovery and naming ==
Gordonopsis mazupo was collected at a depth of 897 meters near the Zhongnan Seamount in the South China Sea in March 2021, during a cruise of the research vessel Tansuo-2. It was found together with a bamboo coral and collected using the human-operated vehicle Shenhaiyongshi.

The species was described in 2024 by Peter K. L. Ng of the National University of Singapore and Xinming Liu of Guangxi University of Chinese Medicine, based on the holotype male specimen. The specific epithet mazupo references Mazu, the Chinese Goddess or Grandmother of the Sea.

== Description ==
Gordonopsis mazupo is a large homolid crab, with the holotype male measuring 33.4 mm in carapace width. The carapace is ovate in shape, distinctly wider posteriorly than anteriorly, with an inflated and prominently convex dorsal surface. The rostrum is relatively short and triangular, flanked by two longer pseudorostral spines. The hepatic region has a short but distinct spine, while the gastric region lacks spines but has patches of granules on the mesogastric areas.

The ambulatory legs (pereiopods 2–5) are very long, with pereiopod 5 reaching well beyond the gastric groove of the carapace when folded anteriorly. The merus (thigh) of each leg is armed with spines, with a prominent spine on the proximal outer surface of pereiopod 4 being a distinguishing feature. The distal segments of pereiopod 5 are modified into a prominent pseudochela.

Third maxilliped pediform, covered with setae but unarmed; ischium rectangular, shorter than merus, with shallow longitudinal shallow groove; merus elongate, subovate, with angular external angle but unarmed, margin uneven and without spines or teeth; palp (carpus, propodus and dactylus) elongate, reaching to proximal margin of ischium.

== Relationships ==
Gordonopsis mazupo most closely resembles G. pacifica from southernmost Japan in the general shape and swollen appearance of the carapace. However, it can be distinguished by the proportionately much longer ambulatory legs, with pereiopod 5 reaching well beyond the gastric groove (only slightly beyond in G. pacifica), as well as relatively longer pseudorostral spines compared to the rostrum. The length of the legs is more similar to G. hera from the Bismarck Sea, but that species has a less inflated carapace and stouter pseudochela claws.

== Distribution and ecology ==
Gordonopsis mazupo is so far only known from the type locality, the Zhongnan Seamount in the central South China Sea, where it was collected at a depth of 897 m, associated with a bamboo coral. It is the second species of Gordonopsis recorded from the South China Sea, after G. ceto from off southern Taiwan.
