= L. elegans =

L. elegans may refer to:

- Laniisoma elegans, the shrike-like cotinga, a bird species found in Brazil, Venezuela, Colombia, Ecuador, Peru and Bolivia
- Latreillia elegans, a crab species found in the Mediterranean and the Atlantic
- Lenzites elegans, a plant pathogen
- Leptorhynchos elegans, a dinosaur species
- Liparoceras elegans, an ammonite species
- Luzula elegans, a nematode species
