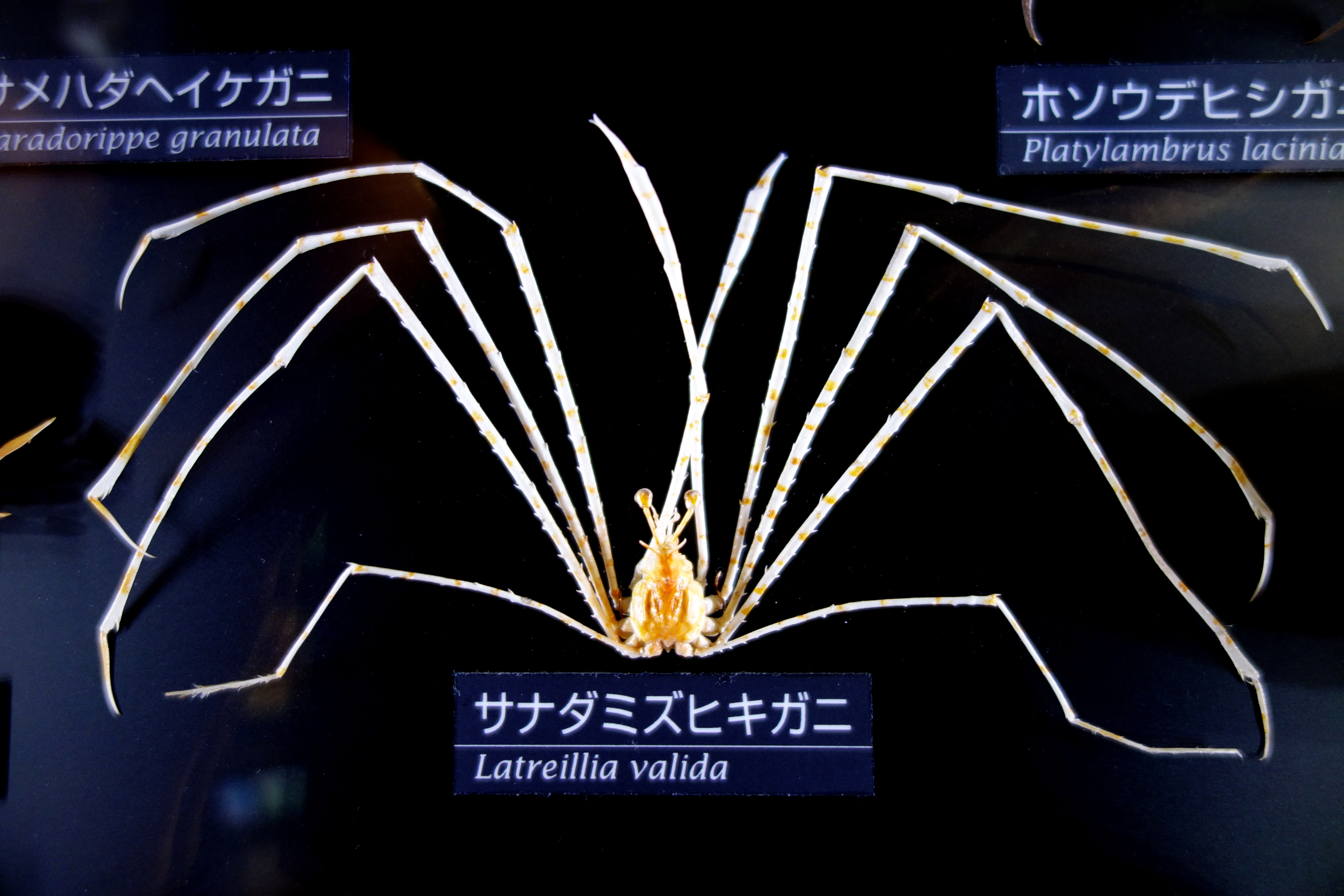
- Latreillia valida

Scientific classification
- Domain: Eukaryota
- Kingdom: Animalia
- Phylum: Arthropoda
- Class: Malacostraca
- Order: Decapoda
- Suborder: Pleocyemata
- Infraorder: Brachyura
- Family: Latreilliidae
- Genus: Latreillia; Roux, 1830

Type species
- Latreillia elegans Roux, 1830

= Latreillia =

Genus of crabs

Latreillia is a genus of crabs in the family Latreilliidae, comprising five species:

- Latreillia elegans Roux, 1830
- Latreillia metanesa Williams, 1982
- Latreillia pennifera Alcock, 1900
- Latreillia valida De Haan, 1839
- Latreillia williamsi Melo, 1990

The name Latreillia honors Pierre André Latreille. A genus of flies was also given the same name and, as a junior homonym, was renamed Belvosia.
