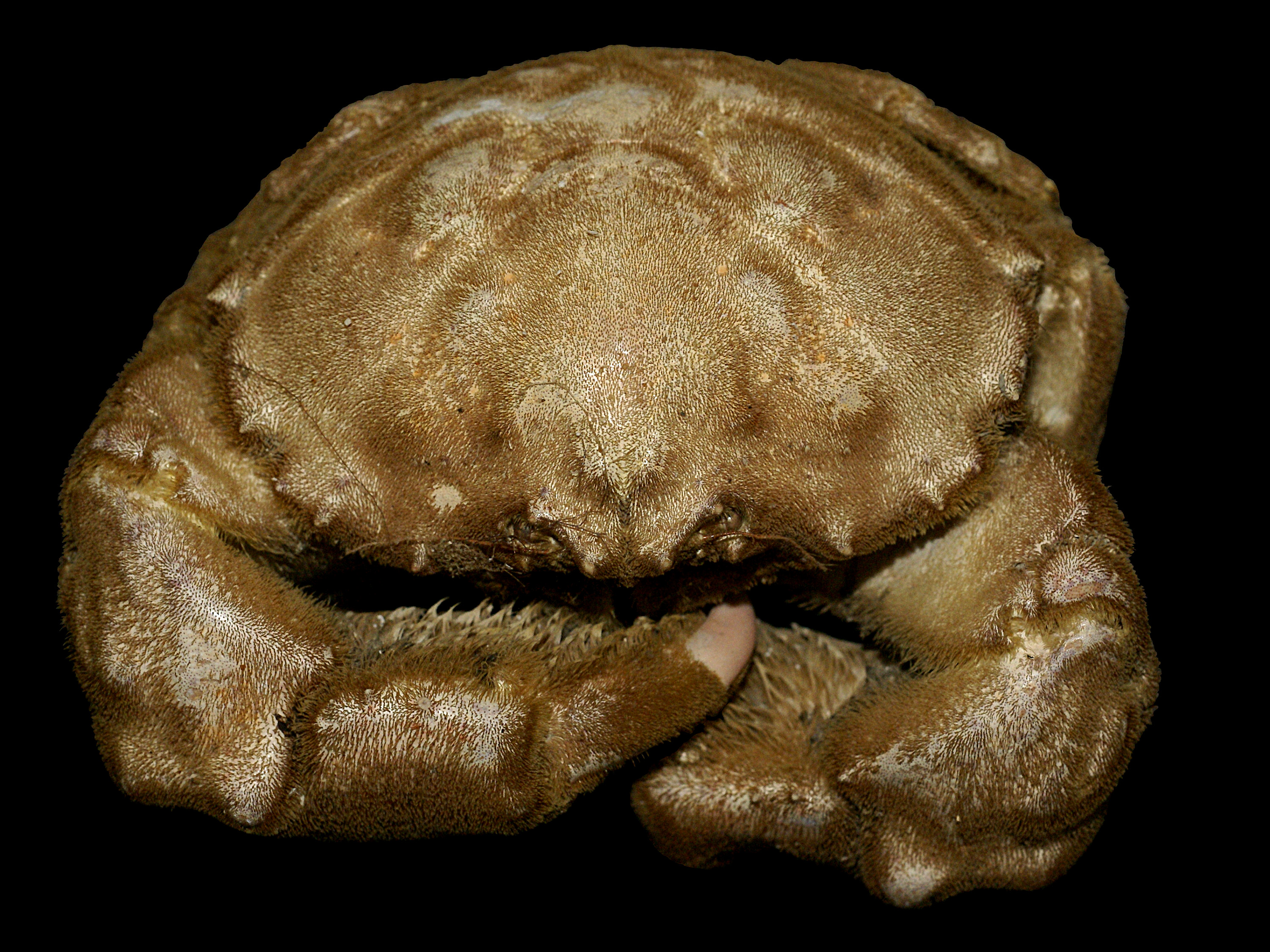
- Dromia personata, family Dromiidae

Scientific classification
- Kingdom: Animalia
- Phylum: Arthropoda
- Clade: Pancrustacea
- Class: Malacostraca
- Order: Decapoda
- Suborder: Pleocyemata
- Infraorder: Brachyura
- Section: Dromiacea
- Superfamily: Dromioidea; De Haan, 1833

Families
- Dromiidae; Dynomenidae; Etyiidae

= Dromioidea =

Dromioidea Temporal range: Late Jurassic–Recent

Superfamily of crabs

Dromioidea is a superfamily of crabs mostly found in Madagascar. Dromioidea belongs to the group Dromiacea, taxonomically ranked as a section, which is the most basal grouping of Brachyura crabs. Dromiacea likely diverged from the rest of Brachyura around the Late Triassic or Early Jurassic, and the earliest fossils attributable to the Dromioidea date from the Late Jurassic.

The below cladogram shows Dromioidea's placement within Dromiacea:

- Dromiacea
  - Dromioidea
    - Dromiidae (may be paraphyletic)
    - Dynomenidae
  - Homoloidea
    - Homolidae (paraphyletic)
    - Latreilliidae

Recent studies have found that the Dromioidea family Dromiidae may be paraphyletic with respect to Dynomenidae.
