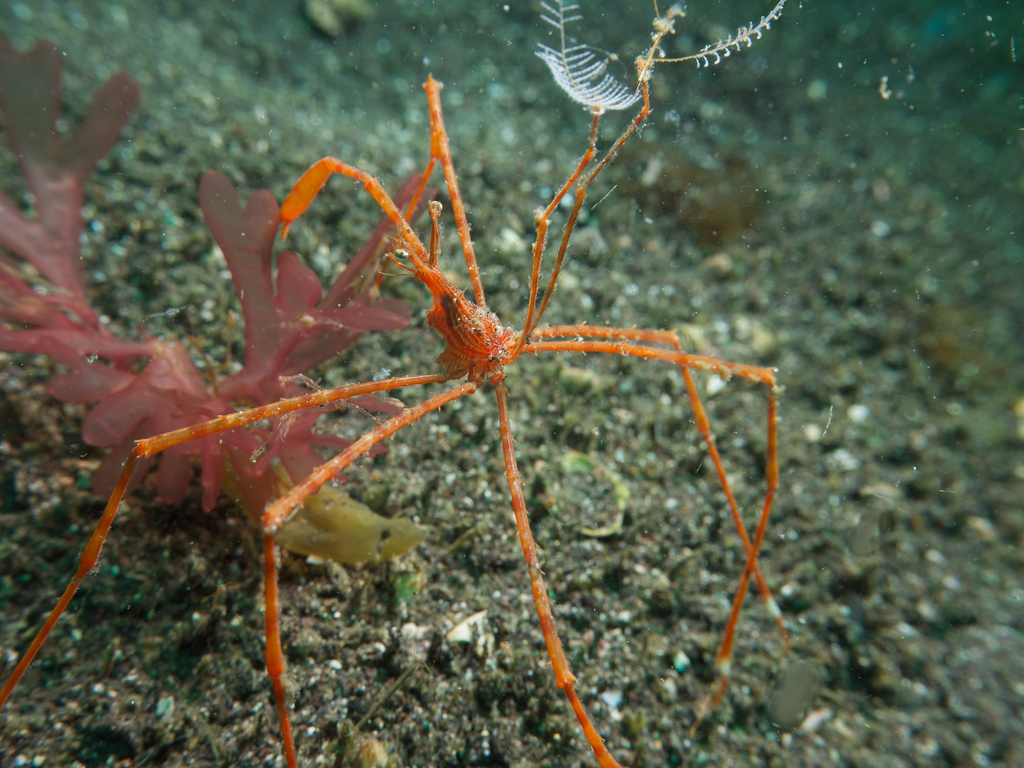
- Eplumula phalangium

Scientific classification
- Domain: Eukaryota
- Kingdom: Animalia
- Phylum: Arthropoda
- Class: Malacostraca
- Order: Decapoda
- Suborder: Pleocyemata
- Infraorder: Brachyura
- Family: Latreilliidae
- Genus: Eplumula; Williams, 1982

Species
- Eplumula australiensis (Henderson, 1888); Eplumula phalangium (De Haan, 1839)

= Eplumula =

Genus of crabs

Eplumula is a genus of crabs in the family Latreilliidae. It is found off the coasts of eastern Asia, commonly China, Japan, and Taiwan.
