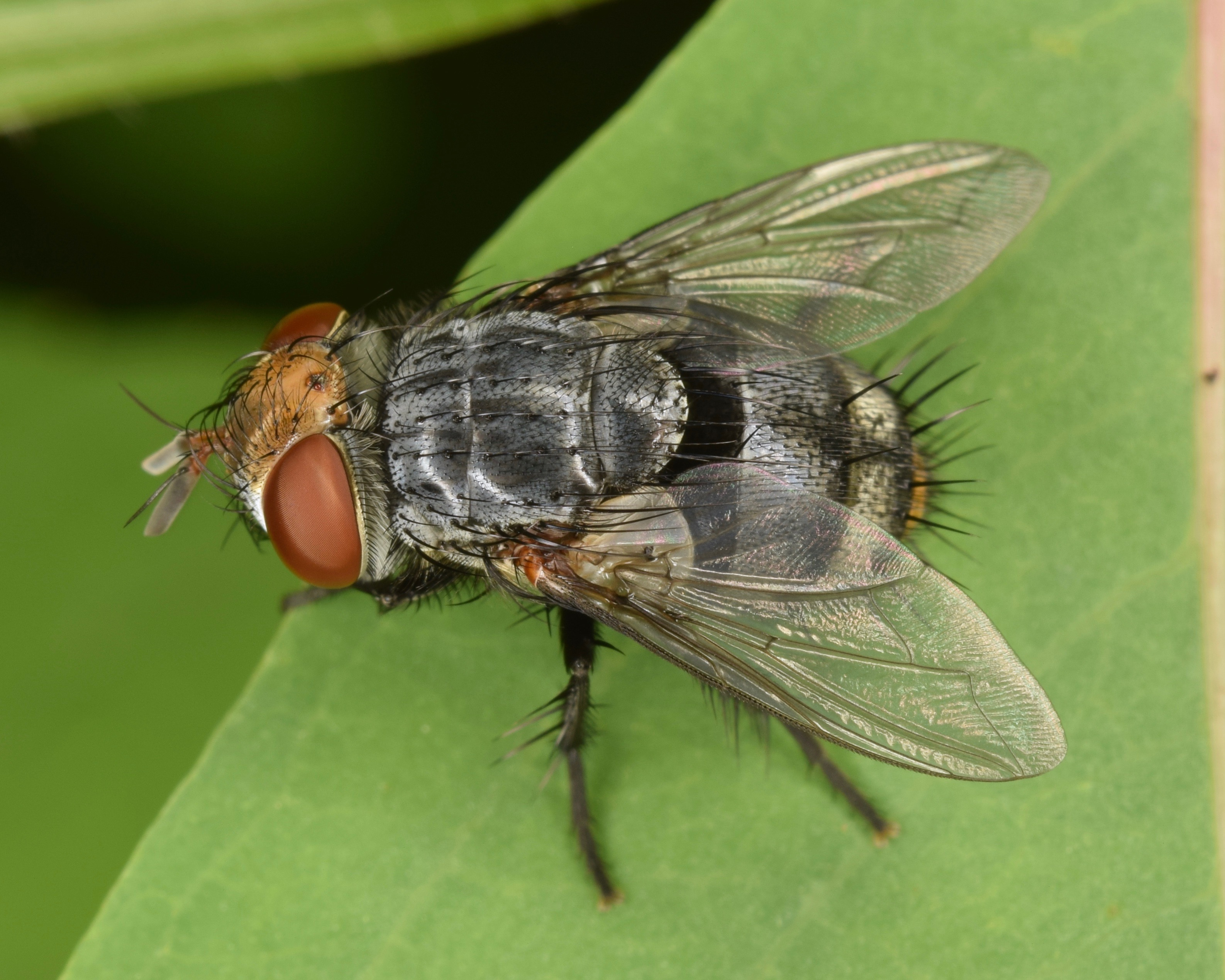

Scientific classification
- Kingdom: Animalia
- Phylum: Arthropoda
- Class: Insecta
- Order: Diptera
- Family: Tachinidae
- Subfamily: Exoristinae
- Tribe: Goniini
- Genus: Belvosia
- Species: B. unifasciata

Binomial name
- Belvosia unifasciata (Robineau-Desvoidy, 1830)

Synonyms
- Frontina chrysopyga Bigot, 1887; Frontina chrysopygata Bigot, 1888; Latreillia unifasciata Robineau-Desvoidy, 1830; Exorista flavicauda Riley, 1870

= Belvosia unifasciata =

Species of fly

Belvosia unifasciata is a species of bristle fly in the family Tachinidae.

== Distribution ==
Canada, United States.
