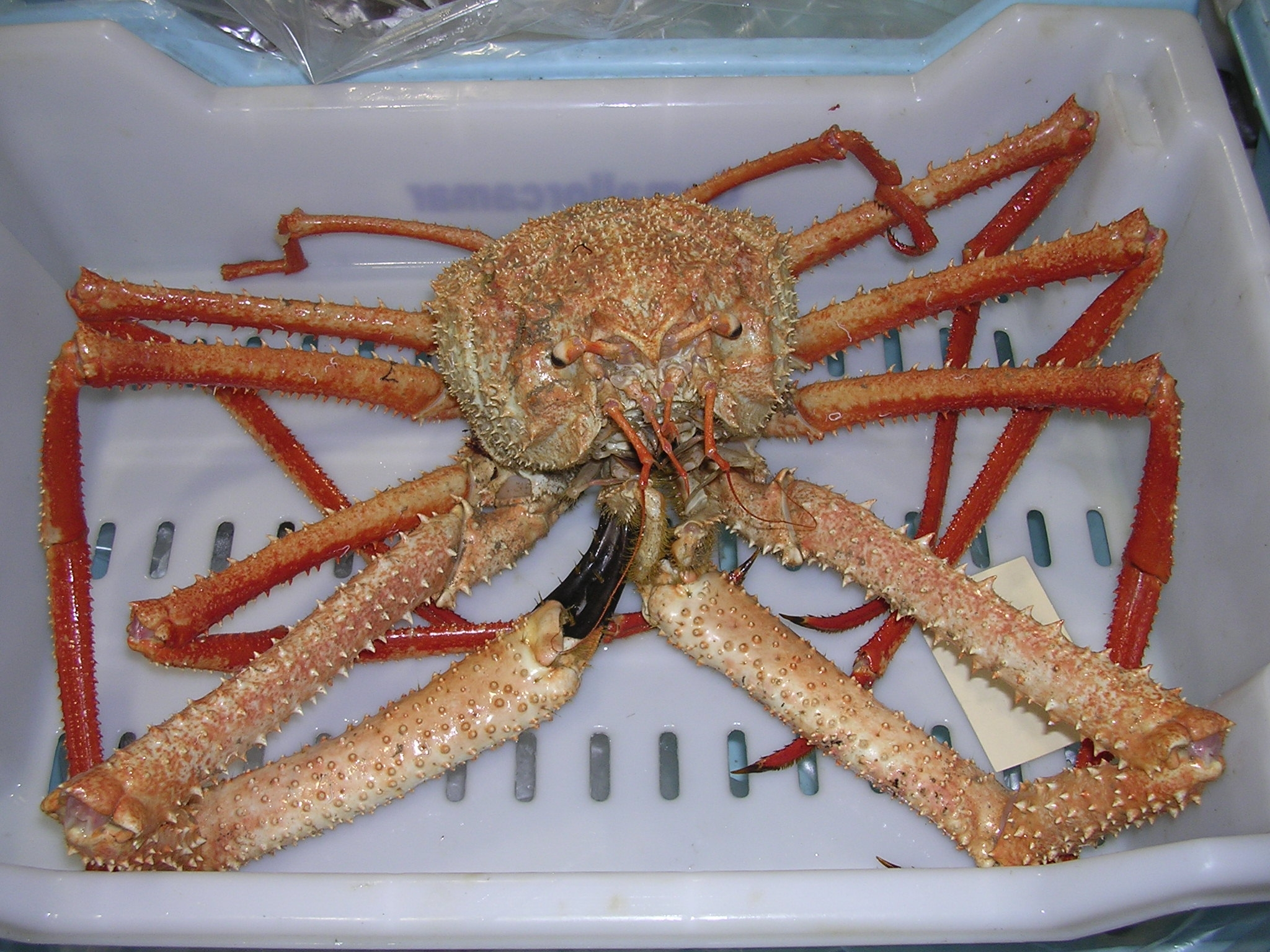
- Paromola cuvieri

Scientific classification
- Domain: Eukaryota
- Kingdom: Animalia
- Phylum: Arthropoda
- Class: Malacostraca
- Order: Decapoda
- Suborder: Pleocyemata
- Infraorder: Brachyura
- Family: Homolidae
- Genus: Paromola; Wood-Mason in Wood-Mason & Alcock, 1891

= Paromola =

Paromola Temporal range: 0.012–Recent Ma

Genus of crabs

Paromola is a genus of crabs within the family Homolidae. Members of the Homolidae genus have their fifth pereiopods (last pair of walking legs) in a sub-dorsal position, which allows them to hold objects, such as sponges, black corals and gorgonians, over the rear half of the carapace, in a possible defence mechanism against predators.

== Species ==
- Paromola bathyalis Guinot & Richer de Forges, 1995
- Paromola crosnieri Guinot & Richer de Forges, 1995
- Paromola cuvieri (Risso, 1816)
- Paromola japonica Parisi, 1915
- Paromola macrochira Sakai, 1961
- Paromola rathbuni Porter, 1908
- † Paromola vetula Crawford, 2008
