= Belvosia borealis =

Scientific classification
- Kingdom: Animalia
- Phylum: Arthropoda
- Class: Insecta
- Order: Diptera
- Family: Tachinidae
- Subfamily: Exoristinae
- Tribe: Goniini
- Genus: Belvosia
- Species: B. borealis

Binomial name
- Belvosia borealis Aldrich, 1928

Synonyms
- Belvosia orion Brimley, 1928

Species of fly

Belvosia borealis is a species of bristle fly in the family Tachinidae. It is a parasitoid of moths from the Ceratomia genus.

== Distribution ==
Canada, United States.
