= Glaessneropsoidea =

Glaessneropsoidea Temporal range: Late Jurassic–Late Cretaceous

Scientific classification
- Kingdom: Animalia
- Phylum: Arthropoda
- Class: Malacostraca
- Order: Decapoda
- Suborder: Pleocyemata
- Infraorder: Brachyura
- Section: Dromiacea
- Superfamily: †Glaessneropsoidea; Patrulius, 1959

Families
- Glaessneropsidae; Lecythocaridae; Longodromitidae; Nodoprosopidae

Superfamily of crabs

Glaessneropsoidea is a superfamily of fossil crabs. They are found in rocks from Late Jurassic age to Late Cretaceous. The 45 species in the superfamily are divided among 11 genera in four families:

Family Glaessneropsidae Patrulius, 1959

- Ekalakia Bishop, 1976
- Glaessneropsis Patrulius, 1959
- Rathbunopon Stenzel, 1945
- Vectis Withers, 1946
- Verrucarcinus Schweitzer & Feldmann, 2009

Family Lecythocaridae Schweitzer & Feldmann, 2009

- Lecythocaris von Meyer, 1860

Family Longodromitidae Schweitzer & Feldmann, 2009

- Abyssophthalmus Schweitzer & Feldmann, 2009
- Coelopus Étallon, 1861
- Longodromites Patrulius, 1959
- Planoprosopon Schweitzer, Feldmann & Lazǎr, 2007

Family Nodoprosopidae Schweitzer & Feldmann, 2009

- Nodoprosopon Beurlen, 1928
