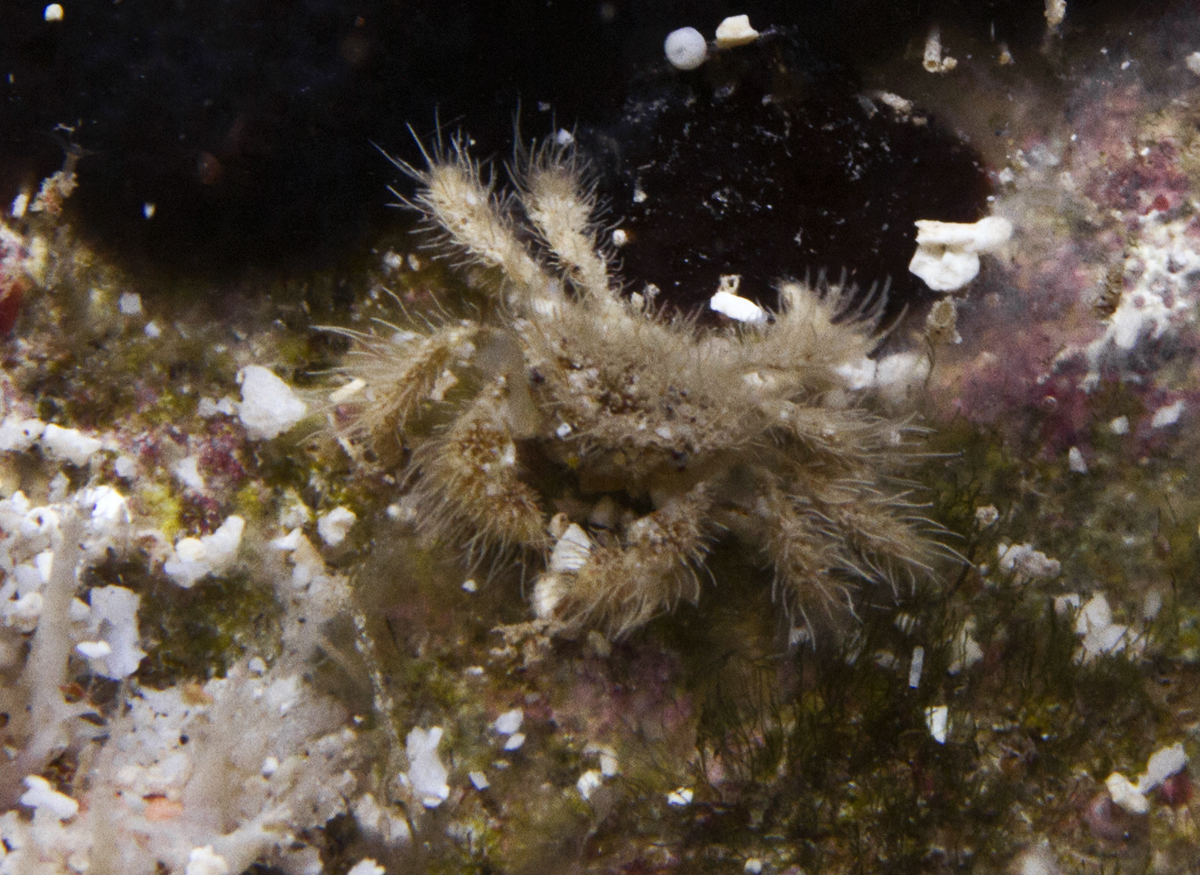
- Hirsutodynomene spinosa

Scientific classification
- Domain: Eukaryota
- Kingdom: Animalia
- Phylum: Arthropoda
- Class: Malacostraca
- Order: Decapoda
- Suborder: Pleocyemata
- Infraorder: Brachyura
- Family: Dynomenidae
- Subfamily: Dynomeninae
- Genus: Hirsutodynomene; McLay, 1999

Type species
- Dynomene spinosa Rathbun, 1911

= Hirsutodynomene =

Genus of crabs

Hirsutodynomene is a genus of crabs in the family Dynomenidae. All species in this genus except the newest one belonged to the genus Dynomene. These two genera form the subfamilia Dynomeninae. The type species of this genus is: Dynomene spinosa Rathbun, 1911.

== Species ==
The following are the 3 species as recorded in the WoRMS database:

- Hirsutodynomene spinosa (Rathbun, 1911)
- Hirsutodynomene ursula (Stimpson, 1860)
- Hirsutodynomene vespertilio Mclay & Ng, 2005
