= Poupiniidae =

Scientific classification
- Domain: Eukaryota
- Kingdom: Animalia
- Phylum: Arthropoda
- Class: Malacostraca
- Order: Decapoda
- Suborder: Pleocyemata
- Infraorder: Brachyura
- Superfamily: Homoloidea
- Family: Poupiniidae; Guinot, 1991

Family of crustaceans

Poupiniidae is a family of crustaceans belonging to the order Decapoda.

== Genera ==
The family contains two genera:

- Poupinia Guinot, 1991
- Rhinopoupinia Feldmann, Tshudy & Thomson, 1993
