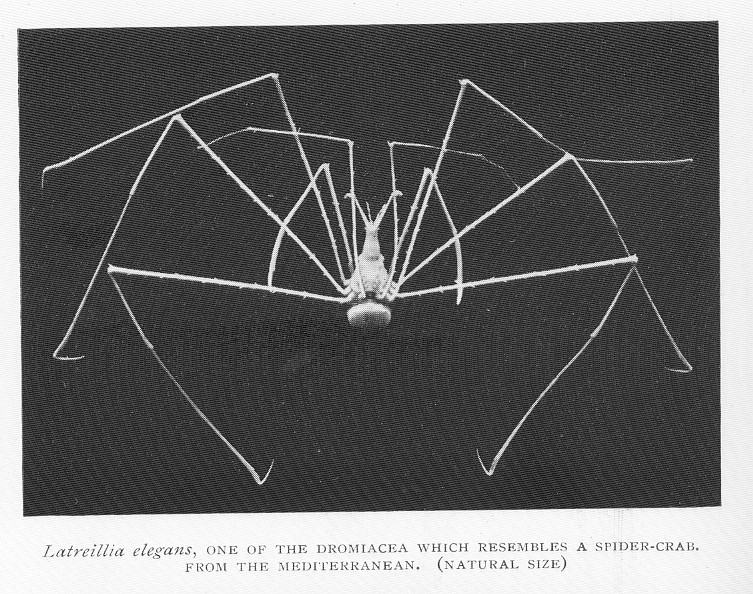
- Latreillia elegans, one of the Drimiacea, which resembles a spider-crab, from the Mediterranean

Scientific classification
- Kingdom: Animalia
- Phylum: Arthropoda
- Class: Malacostraca
- Order: Decapoda
- Suborder: Pleocyemata
- Infraorder: Brachyura
- Family: Latreilliidae
- Genus: Latreillia
- Species: L. elegans

Binomial name
- Latreillia elegans Roux, 1830

Subspecies
- Latreillia elegans elegans Roux, 1830

Synonyms
- Latreillia manningi Williams, 1982

= Latreillia elegans =

Species of crustacean

Latreillia elegans is a species of crab belonging to the family Latreilliidae. This family of crabs is identified by their appearance as small, long-legged crabs. The species belongs to the genus Latreillia which has only five identified species: L. elegans, L. metanesa, L. williamsi, L.valida, and L. pennifera. It was previously thought that L. elegans and L. mannengi were two separate species, but it has since been revealed that the two species are synonymous. All the thought to be differences between L. elegans and L. mannengi were in actuality overlaps. The L. mannengi is simply referring to the close relative to the species of L. elegans found in the western Atlantic.

== Description and movement ==
L. elegans have a general physical structure similar to other species in the order decapoda. This species has a pyriform carapace about 4.1 mm in length, it is twice as long as it is wide. The dorsal surface of the gastric region does not have a spine besides for some observed in juveniles and smaller members of the species. They have two long "supra-ocular" spines and a broad abdomen with a short spine in both sexes. In females, the first segment of the abdomen has a median tubercle, the second and third segments each have a strong median spine, and the fourth, fifth, and sixth segments have a spine near each one of their lateral margins. In males, each of the segments is different and the second segment, specifically, has a spine. The eyes are pyriform and slender, about the same length as the supraorbital horns. Their chelipeds are long, thin and three times the length of their body; the legs (pereopods)are often described as being almost filiform. These spindly legs are used for movement, and given the length of their limb it may be possible to assume that they can walk forward. In the genus Latreillia, the last pair of legs are distinctly longer than half of the carapace, with feather-like hairs running down in rows. The L. elegans is slightly yellow with red banding around its long legs. They closely resemble spider crabs in the Mediterranean.

== Distribution ==
L. elegans exists in the marine benthic environment. The species has documented distribution in the Mediterranean Sea, eastern Atlantic Ocean (spans Portugal to the Cape Verde Islands), western Atlantic Ocean (spans New England to Venezuela), and south Atlantic Ocean (spans Ascension Island to St. Helena Islands). They have been reported at a depth of 35–474 m. The family Latreilliidae is generally found on soft bottoms in tropical and sub-temperate waters.

== Life cycle and reproduction ==
The developmental stages of the Latreillia elegans have yet to be observed or documented. Documented collections of this organism have all been in the megalopa stage (between planktonic and adult/benthic period). Despite this lack of information, members of the infraorder Brachyura typically hatch from a brood of eggs and enter the zoeal stage, then maturing into the megalopa stage before finally entering the juvenile phase where they will eventually reach sexual maturity. From the larval stage onward, there are several rounds of molts that result in greater development and growth each time. The duration/length of development within each of these stages most likely will vary from species to species. There is also little knowledge of the breeding habits of L. elegans. Like most members of the order decapoda, this species is probably gonochoric and oviparous. Interesting findings of gravid female L.elegans around January, March to July, and September, may suggest that this species breeds seasonally.

== Feeding and ecological interactions ==
The diet and feeding behavior of L. elegans is not recorded, however, they are likely omnivorous like most members of the infraorder Brachyura, feeding on algae, bacteria and detritus. Despite not having their ecological role clearly stated, it is likely that, like most other crabs, L. elegans have a significance in the food web on multiple levels. At any stage of their life cycle, they may serve as prey for larger invertebrates and vertebrates or as predators and competition to smaller marine organisms. Furthermore, there has been a study on a potential relationship between L. elegans and sea pens (Pennatula phosphorea). L. elegans have been observed to climb on sea pens potentially using them as a source of food or even as a source of elevation for better access to food/prey. It is also suggested that the sea pens may provide protection and shelter as the L. elegans tended to choose sea pens with coloring similar to their own, creating protection from predators through camouflage. This potential relationship provides some insight into the L. elegans role in promoting biodiversity in soft bottom environments in tropical waters.

== See also ==
- List of Atlantic decapod species
