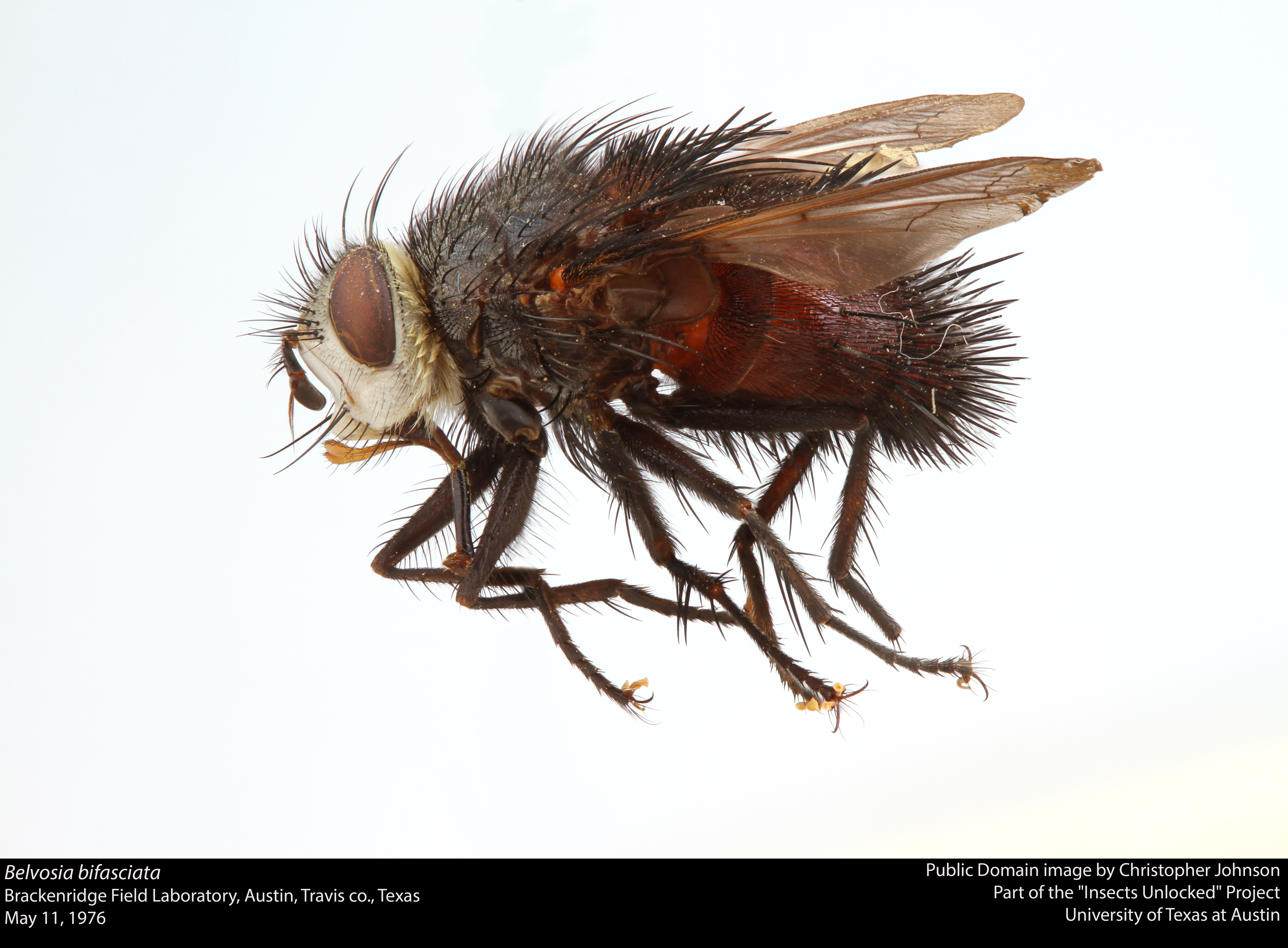

Scientific classification
- Kingdom: Animalia
- Phylum: Arthropoda
- Class: Insecta
- Order: Diptera
- Family: Tachinidae
- Subfamily: Exoristinae
- Tribe: Goniini
- Genus: Belvosia
- Species: B. bifasciata

Binomial name
- Belvosia bifasciata (Fabricius, 1775)

Synonyms
- Musca bifasciata Fabricius, 1775

= Belvosia bifasciata =

Species of fly

Belvosia bifasciata is a species of bristle fly in the family Tachinidae.

== Distribution ==
United States, Puerto Rico, Guatemala, Mexico.
