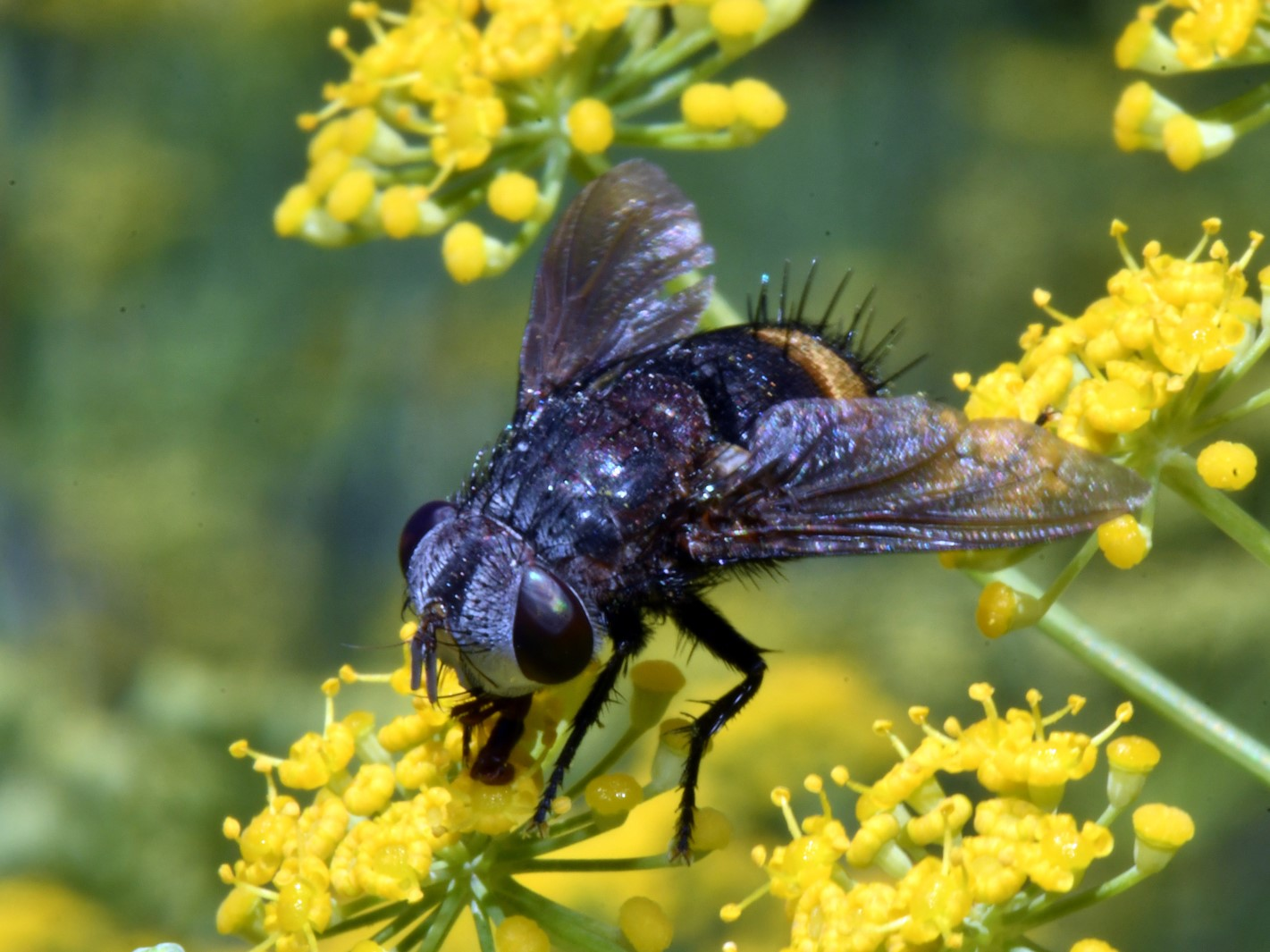

Scientific classification
- Kingdom: Animalia
- Phylum: Arthropoda
- Class: Insecta
- Order: Diptera
- Family: Tachinidae
- Subfamily: Exoristinae
- Tribe: Goniini
- Genus: Belvosia
- Species: B. semiflava

Binomial name
- Belvosia semiflava Aldrich, 1928

= Belvosia semiflava =

Species of fly

Belvosia semiflava is a species of bristle fly in the family Tachinidae.

== Distribution ==
Mexico, United States.
