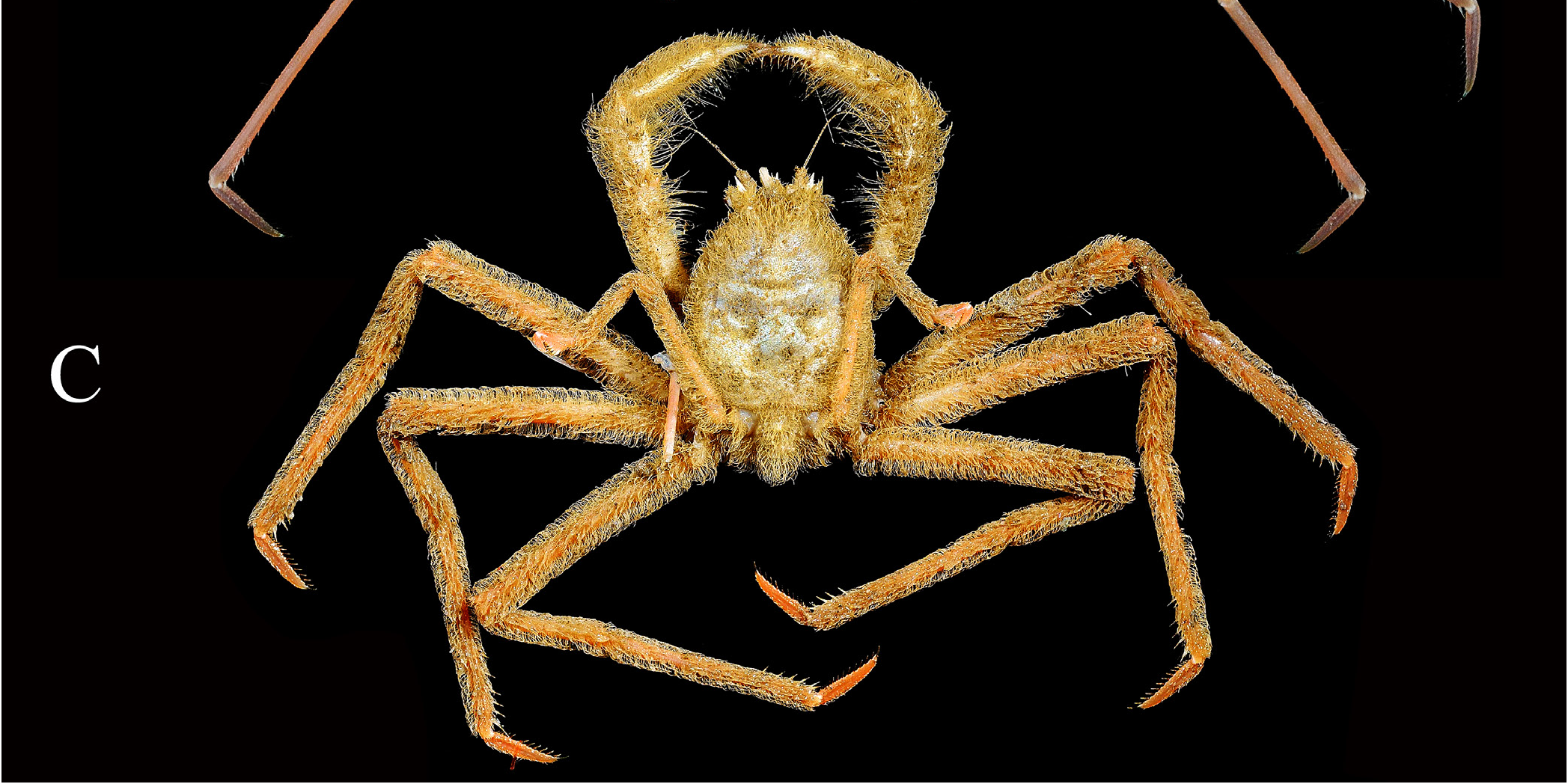
- Gordonopsis velutina

Scientific classification
- Domain: Eukaryota
- Kingdom: Animalia
- Phylum: Arthropoda
- Class: Malacostraca
- Order: Decapoda
- Suborder: Pleocyemata
- Infraorder: Brachyura
- Family: Homolidae
- Genus: Gordonopsis; Guinot & Richer de Forges, 1995

= Gordonopsis =

Genus of crabs

Gordonopsis is a genus of deep sea crabs in the family Homolidae. The Homolidae are also known as carrier crabs or porter crabs for their fifth pereiopods (last pair of walking legs), which they use to hold objects in place over the rear half of the carapace in a possible defence mechanism against predators. Species of Gordonopsis are found in deep waters of the Indo-West Pacific region. The genus was erected in 1995 by Danièle Guinot and Bertrand Richer de Forges.

== Taxonomy and systematics ==
The genus Gordonopsis was established in 1995 by French carcinologists Danièle Guinot and Bertrand Richer de Forges to accommodate the species Homola profundorum, which had previously been classified in the genus Homola. The genus name honors Isabelle Gordon of the British Museum (Natural History) for her contributions to crustacean taxonomy.

Since its initial description, several new species have been added to the genus. A major revision of Gordonopsis was published in 2020 by Peter K. L. Ng and Bertrand Richer de Forges, recognizing 8 valid species:

- Gordonopsis alaini Ng & Richer de Forges, 2020
- Gordonopsis ceto Ng & Richer de Forges, 2020
- Gordonopsis hera Ng & Richer de Forges, 2020
- Gordonopsis mazupo Ng & Liu, 2024
- Gordonopsis pacifica Takeda & Suyama, 2019
- Gordonopsis phorcys Ng & Richer de Forges, 2020
- Gordonopsis profundarum (Alcock & Anderson, 1899) (type species)
- Gordonopsis robusta Ng, Padate & Saravanane, 2019
- Gordonopsis velutina Ng & Richer de Forges, 2020

== Description ==
Species of Gordonopsis are characterized by a longitudinally ovate or polygonal carapace that is slightly wider than long. The rostrum is triangular and flanked by prominent pseudorostral spines. The dorsal surface of the carapace is distinctly convex in lateral view and covered in setae. The legs are long and slender, with the fifth pair (pereiopods) subchelate and folding forwards over the carapace.

== Distribution and ecology ==
Gordonopsis crabs are found exclusively in the deep sea, typically at depths of 300 to over 2,000 meters. The genus has an Indo-West Pacific distribution, with species recorded from the Indian Ocean (Andaman Sea, Bay of Bengal) and the western Pacific Ocean (South China Sea, Philippines, Indonesia, Japan, Papua New Guinea).

Little is known about the ecology and behavior of these crabs due to the difficulties in studying deep-sea fauna. They are presumed to be opportunistic scavengers and predators like other deep-sea crabs. Some species have been found associated with deep-sea corals.
