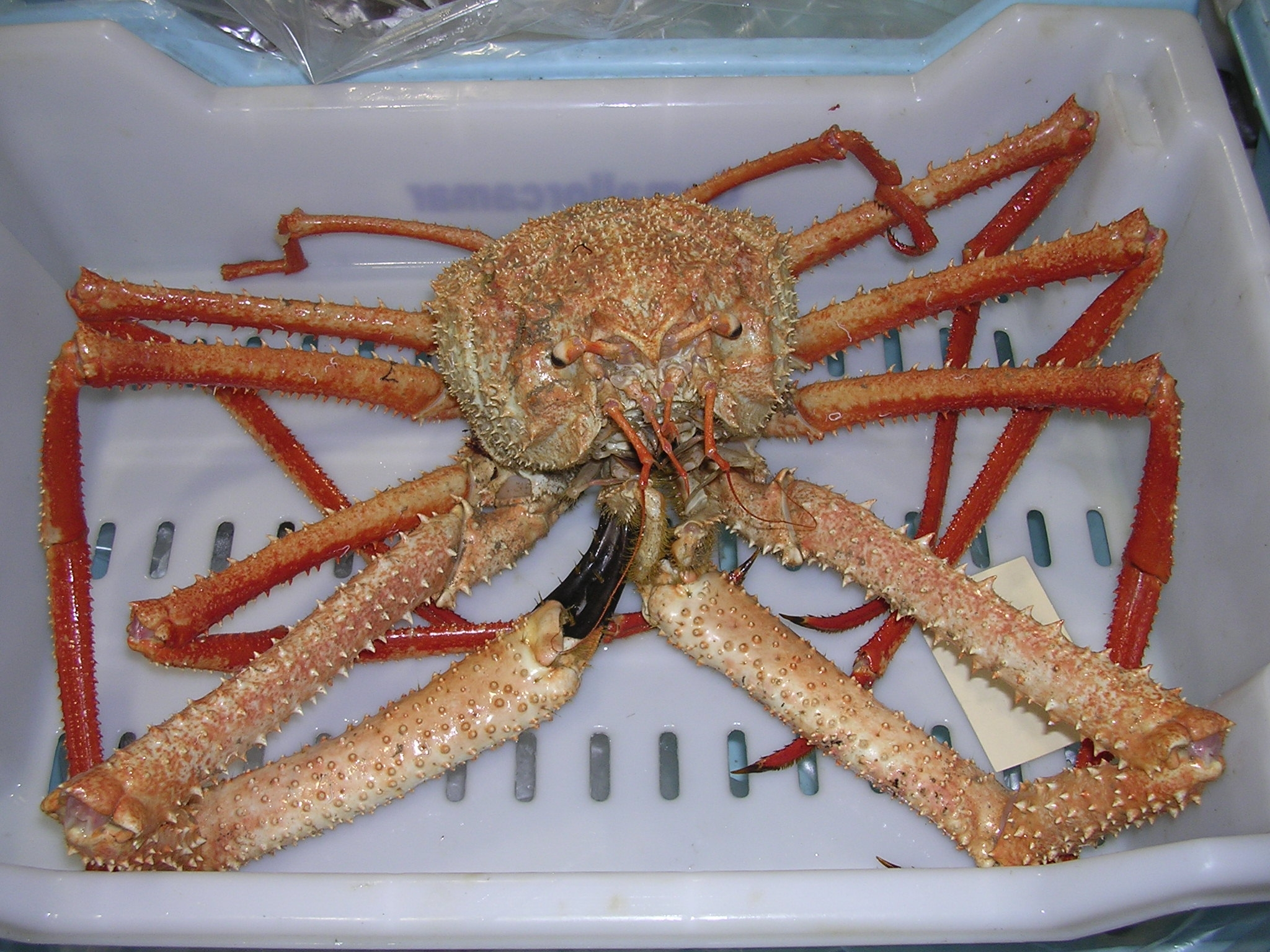

Scientific classification
- Kingdom: Animalia
- Phylum: Arthropoda
- Clade: Pancrustacea
- Class: Malacostraca
- Order: Decapoda
- Suborder: Pleocyemata
- Infraorder: Brachyura
- Family: Homolidae
- Genus: Paromola
- Species: P. cuvieri

Binomial name
- Paromola cuvieri (Risso, 1816)

Synonyms
- Dorippe cuvieri Risso, 1816; Maia dumerili Risso, 1816

= Paromola cuvieri =

Species of crab

Paromola cuvieri is a species of crab in the family Homolidae, the carrier crabs. It occurs in the eastern Atlantic Ocean and the Mediterranean Sea, from Angola to Norway, the Northern Isles and Iceland. It is demersal, occurring at depths of 10–1,212 metres (33–3,976 ft), but it is primarily found deeper than 80 m (260 ft). It prefers areas with mud and emerging rocks, and has been observed in deep-water coral gardens and sponge aggregations. It is locally common.

This reddish crab is sexually dimorphic; the males have larger claws and are overall larger than the females. The carapace of the largest males can reach 21.5 cm (8.5 in), while their claws can span 1.2 m (4 ft). Like other members of the family, most P. cuvieri in their natural habitat carry an object, typically a living sessile invertebrate such as a sponge or deep-water coral, over the carapace in the small hindlegs. This may be used as camouflage, but is also used actively in defense by positioning the object between the crab and a would-be attacker. P. cuvieri is a scavenger of a wide range of animal matters, and a predator of animals such as decapods, but only rarely takes small benthic species (glycerids, cumaceans and amphipods).
