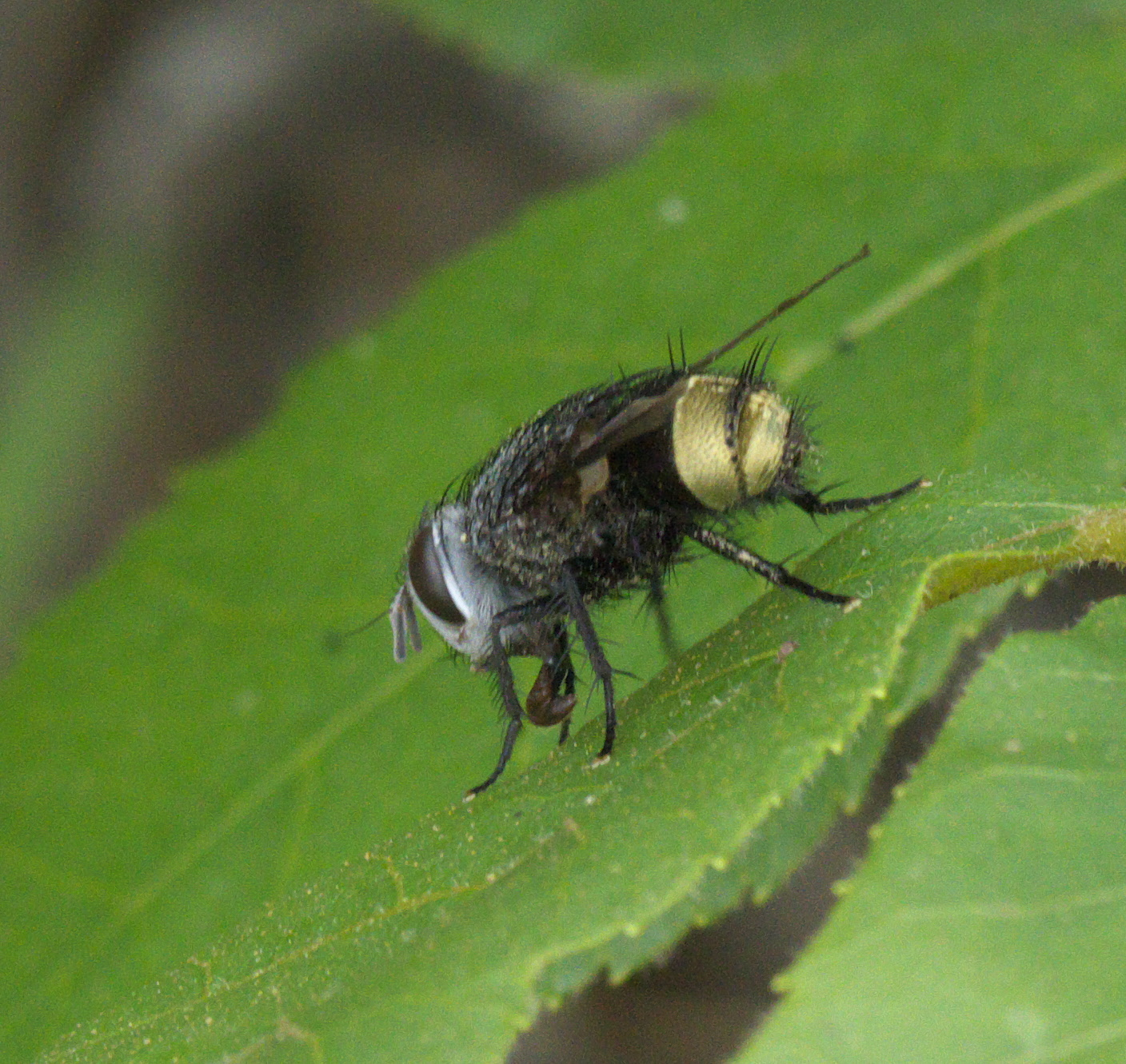

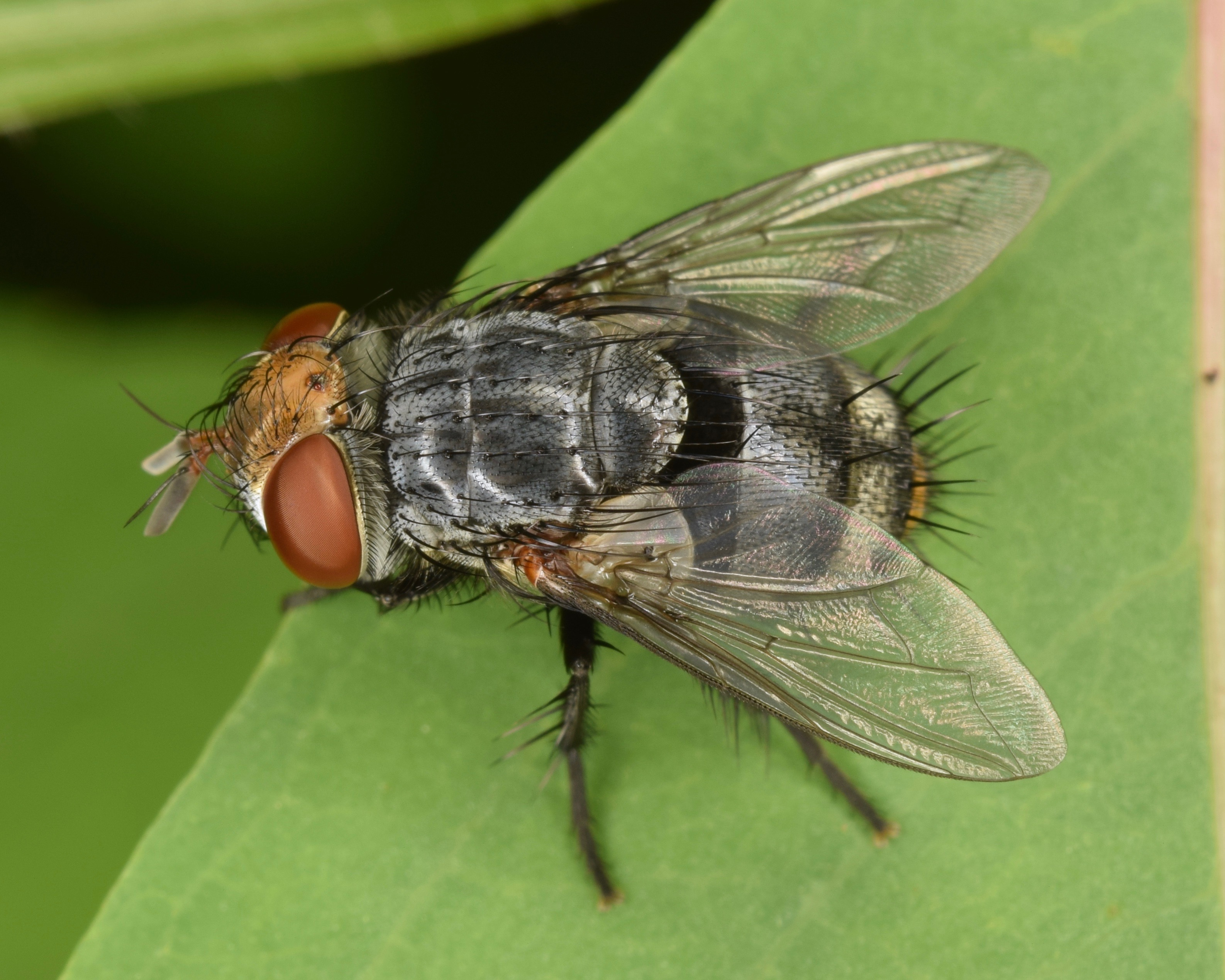
- Belvosia unifasciata

Scientific classification
- Kingdom: Animalia
- Phylum: Arthropoda
- Class: Insecta
- Order: Diptera
- Family: Tachinidae
- Subfamily: Exoristinae
- Tribe: Goniini
- Genus: Belvosia; Robineau-Desvoidy, 1830

Type species
- Belvosia bicincta Robineau-Desvoidy, 1830

Synonyms
- Bebrocisia Ragues, 1908; Belvoisia Loew, 1862; Belvosiomima Townsend, 1915; Belvosiopsis Townsend, 1927; Eubelvosiopsis Blanchard, 1954; Goniomima Townsend, 1908; Latreillia Robineau-Desvoidy, 1830; Latreillimyia Townsend, 1908; Neobelvosiopsis Blanchard, 1954; Parabelvosia Blanchard, 1954; Pseudobelvosia Blanchard, 1954; Triachora Townsend, 1908; Willistonia Brauer & von Berganstamm, 1889

= Belvosia =

Genus of flies

Belvosia is a genus of flies in the family Tachinidae.

== Species ==
- Belvosia adrianguadamuzi Fleming & Woodley, 2023
- Belvosia aldrichi (Townsend, 1931)
- Belvosia anacarballoae Fleming & Woodley, 2023
- Belvosia analis Macquart, 1846
- Belvosia angelhernandezi Fleming & Woodley, 2023
- Belvosia ansata Reinhard, 1951
- Belvosia argentifrons Aldrich, 1928
- Belvosia auratilis Reinhard, 1951
- Belvosia auripilosa (Blanchard, 1954)
- Belvosia aurulenta (Bigot, 1888)
- Belvosia australis Aldrich, 1928
- Belvosia barbosai (Cortés & Campos, 1971)
- Belvosia bella Giglio-Tos, 1893
- Belvosia bicincta Robineau-Desvoidy, 1830
- Belvosia biezankoi (Blanchard, 1961)
- Belvosia bifasciata (Fabricius, 1775)
- Belvosia borealis Aldrich, 1928
- Belvosia bosqi (Blanchard, 1954)
- Belvosia brigittevilchezae Fleming & Woodley, 2023
- Belvosia bruchi (Blanchard, 1954)
- Belvosia calixtomoragai Fleming & Woodley, 2023
- Belvosia canadensis Curran, 1927
- Belvosia canalis Aldrich, 1928
- Belvosia carolinacanoae Fleming & Woodley, 2023
- Belvosia catamarcensis Blanchard, 1954
- Belvosia chaetosa (Blanchard, 1954)
- Belvosia chiesai (Blanchard, 1954)
- Belvosia ciliata Aldrich, 1928
- Belvosia ciriloumanai Fleming & Woodley, 2023
- Belvosia contermina (Walker, 1853)
- Belvosia diniamartinezae Fleming & Woodley, 2023
- Belvosia duniagarciae Fleming & Woodley, 2023
- Belvosia duvalierbricenoi Fleming & Woodley, 2023
- Belvosia eldaarayae Fleming & Woodley, 2023
- Belvosia eliethcantillanoae Fleming & Woodley, 2023
- Belvosia elusa Aldrich, 1926
- Belvosia equinoctialis (Townsend, 1912)
- Belvosia ferruginosa Townsend, 1895
- Belvosia formosa Aldrich, 1928
- Belvosia formosana (Blanchard, 1954)
- Belvosia fosteri (Townsend, 1915)
- Belvosia freddyquesadai Fleming & Woodley, 2023
- Belvosia frontalis Aldrich, 1928
- Belvosia fuscisquamula (Blanchard, 1954)
- Belvosia gloriasihezarae Fleming & Woodley, 2023
- Belvosia guillermopereirai Fleming & Woodley, 2023
- Belvosia harryramirezi Fleming & Woodley, 2023
- Belvosia hazelcambroneroae Fleming & Woodley, 2023
- Belvosia jorgehernandezi Fleming & Woodley, 2023
- Belvosia josecortezi Fleming & Woodley, 2023
- Belvosia joseperezi Fleming & Woodley, 2023
- Belvosia keinoraragoni Fleming & Woodley, 2023
- Belvosia lata Aldrich, 1928
- Belvosia leucopyga Wulp, 1882
- Belvosia lilloi (Blanchard, 1954)
- Belvosia lugubris (Blanchard, 1954)
- Belvosia luiciariosae Fleming & Woodley, 2023
- Belvosia manni Aldrich, 1928
- Belvosia manuelpereirai Fleming & Woodley, 2023
- Belvosia manuelriosi Fleming & Woodley, 2023
- Belvosia matamorosa Reinhard, 1951
- Belvosia minorcarmoni Fleming & Woodley, 2023
- Belvosia mira Reinhard, 1958
- Belvosia naccina Reinhard, 1975
- Belvosia nigrifrons Aldrich, 1928
- Belvosia obesula (Wulp, 1890)
- Belvosia ochriventris (Wulp, 1890)
- Belvosia odvaldoespinozai Fleming & Woodley, 2023
- Belvosia omissa Aldrich, 1928
- Belvosia pabloumanai Fleming & Woodley, 2023
- Belvosia petronariosae Fleming & Woodley, 2023
- Belvosia piurana Townsend, 1911
- Belvosia pollinosa Rowe, 1933
- Belvosia potens (Wiedemann, 1830)
- Belvosia proxima (Walker, 1853)
- Belvosia recticornis (Macquart, 1855)
- Belvosia ricardocaleroi Fleming & Woodley, 2023
- Belvosia robertoespinozai Fleming & Woodley, 2023
- Belvosia rostermoragai Fleming & Woodley, 2023
- Belvosia ruficornis Aldrich, 1928
- Belvosia rufifrons Blanchard, 1954
- Belvosia ruthfrancoae Fleming & Woodley, 2023
- Belvosia semiflava Aldrich, 1928
- Belvosia sergioriosi Fleming & Woodley, 2023
- Belvosia slossonae Coquillett, 1895
- Belvosia smithi Aldrich, 1928
- Belvosia spinicoxa Aldrich, 1928
- Belvosia splendens Curran, 1927
- Belvosia tibialis (Blanchard, 1954)
- Belvosia townsendi Aldrich, 1928
- Belvosia unifasciata (Robineau-Desvoidy, 1830)
- Belvosia vanderwulpi Williston, 1886
- Belvosia villaricana Reinhard, 1951
- Belvosia vittata Aldrich, 1928
- Belvosia wiedemanni Aldrich, 1928
- Belvosia williamsi Aldrich, 1928
- Belvosia willinki (Blanchard, 1954)
