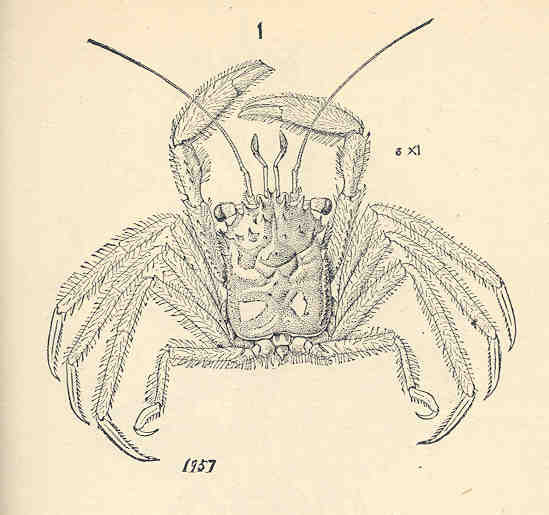

Scientific classification
- Domain: Eukaryota
- Kingdom: Animalia
- Phylum: Arthropoda
- Class: Malacostraca
- Order: Decapoda
- Suborder: Pleocyemata
- Infraorder: Brachyura
- Family: Homolidae
- Genus: Homola
- Species: H. barbata

Binomial name
- Homola barbata (Fabricius, 1793)

Synonyms
- Cancer barbatus Fabricius, 1793; Cancer cubicus Forskål, 1775 (suppressed); Cancer novemdecos Sulzer, 1776 (suppressed); Dorippe fronticornis Lamarck in White, 1847 (nomen nudum); Thelxiope palpigera Rafinesque, 1814; Homola spinifrons Leach, 1815; Dorippe spinosus Risso, 1816

= Homola barbata =

Species of crab

Homola barbata is a species of crab in the family Homolidae.

== Description ==
They usually have squarish carapaces with forward-pointing spines along the upper front edges. The animal's chelipeds are shorter than their other legs (the back pair are short, thin and doubled back on themselves). The animal's carapace grows to 2 inches (51 mm) long.

== Ecology ==
Homola barbata inhabits shelly, sandy, and muddy seabeds at depths of 130–1,300 feet (40–396 m). They feed on algae, small mollusks and also scavenge for food. Reproduction is sexual, and through copulation.

== Distribution ==
In the eastern part of its range, Homola barbata is found in the Mediterranean Sea and into the North Atlantic. In the western part of its range, H. barbata is found from Virginia southwards, through the Gulf of Mexico and the West Indies, along the coasts of Central and South America to Rio Grande do Sul, Brazil.
