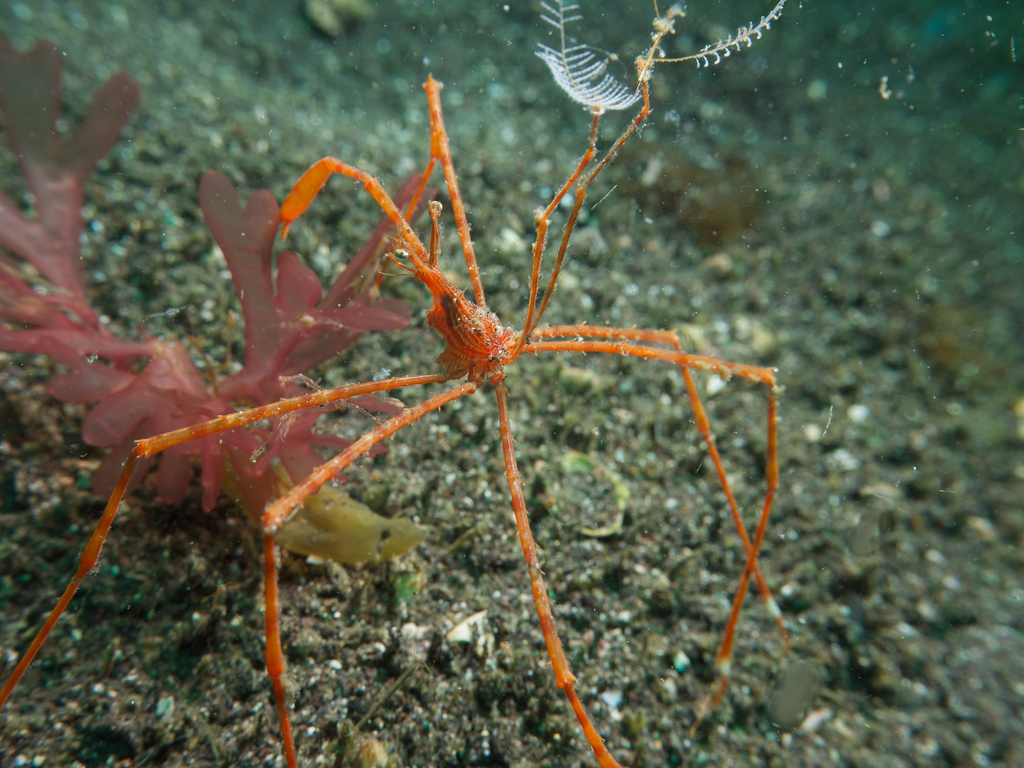
- Eplumula phalangium

Scientific classification
- Kingdom: Animalia
- Phylum: Arthropoda
- Clade: Pancrustacea
- Class: Malacostraca
- Order: Decapoda
- Suborder: Pleocyemata
- Infraorder: Brachyura
- Section: Dromiacea
- Superfamily: Homoloidea
- Family: Latreilliidae; Stimpson, 1858

Genera
- †Belos Franţescu, 2014; Eplumula Williams, 1982; Latreillia Roux, 1830

= Latreilliidae =

Family of crabs

Latreilliidae is a small family of crabs. They are relatively small, long-legged crabs found on soft bottoms at depths of up 700 metres (2,300 ft) in mostly tropical and subtemperate waters around the world. Their carapace is very small and doesn’t cover the bases of their legs, which protrude from the cephalothorax in a spider-like manner. The family and its type genus are named after Pierre André Latreille. The oldest known fossils from the Latreillidae have been dated to the middle of the Cretaceous period. It comprises seven extant species.

== Distribution ==
Most species in Latreilliidae are relatively concentrated in the Indo-Pacific region, but sometimes may be found in adjacent regions. They are usually found in the mesopelagic zone of these regions. Five of the seven species are located mainly in this region(L. metanesa, L. pennifera, L. valida, E. australiensis, and E. phalangium). Sightings of some of these species have been reported outside of this region: L. metanesa have been found in seamounts in the Eastern pacific region, E. australiensis in temperate Eastern Australia, and E. phalangium in temperate Northern Japan. The two remaining species are located outside the Indo-Pacific regions: L. elegans in the Mediterranean and temperate Atlantic Ocean, and L. williamsi in the temperate South Atlantic across the eastern coast of South America.

== Morphology ==
The crabs of Latreilliidae, being part of the phylum Decapoda, have ten legs, or five pairs of legs, and a chitinous carapace. They are characterized by their long, skinny legs, which help them move sideways(their fourth pereopod is used for locomotion), and their small carapace. They also possess a dorsal spine on their gastric region(with the exception of E. australiensis).

Sexual dimorphism is present in Latreilliidae: the abdomens of both sexes consists of 6 segments, with segments 4-6 fused into a plate in females, while the smaller abdomens of males consists of 6 distinct segments. In E. australiensis females, the spine on each hepatic swelling as well as the dorsal spine are larger and thicker. In males, the carapace is wider, and the gastric region in females is narrower. In L. metanesa females, the teeth on the third maxilliped protrude more than in males.

Latreilliidae crabs also exhibit carrying behavior; their fifth pereopod has been modified to carry pieces of sponges, hydroids, or corals over the dorsal region of their body. Materials are held between the propodi and dactyl of this pereopod. In some species, the same pereopod also has a small subchelate digit at its end which is likely used to hold objects.

== Life History Traits ==
Like most other crabs, those in the Latreilliidae family have a mainly omnivorous diet, feeding on organisms like algae, barnacles, and shrimps. Their well-developed vision, mobility, and specialized appendages allow them to capture their prey. They start off as microscopic zoea larvae, which moult and grow constantly until they reach the adult stage. Their sexes are gonochoric, and mating rituals are common between the two sexes. Like most decapods, they are oviparous, giving birth to their young through fertilized eggs. Some species, like L. valida, undergo indirect sperm transfer.
