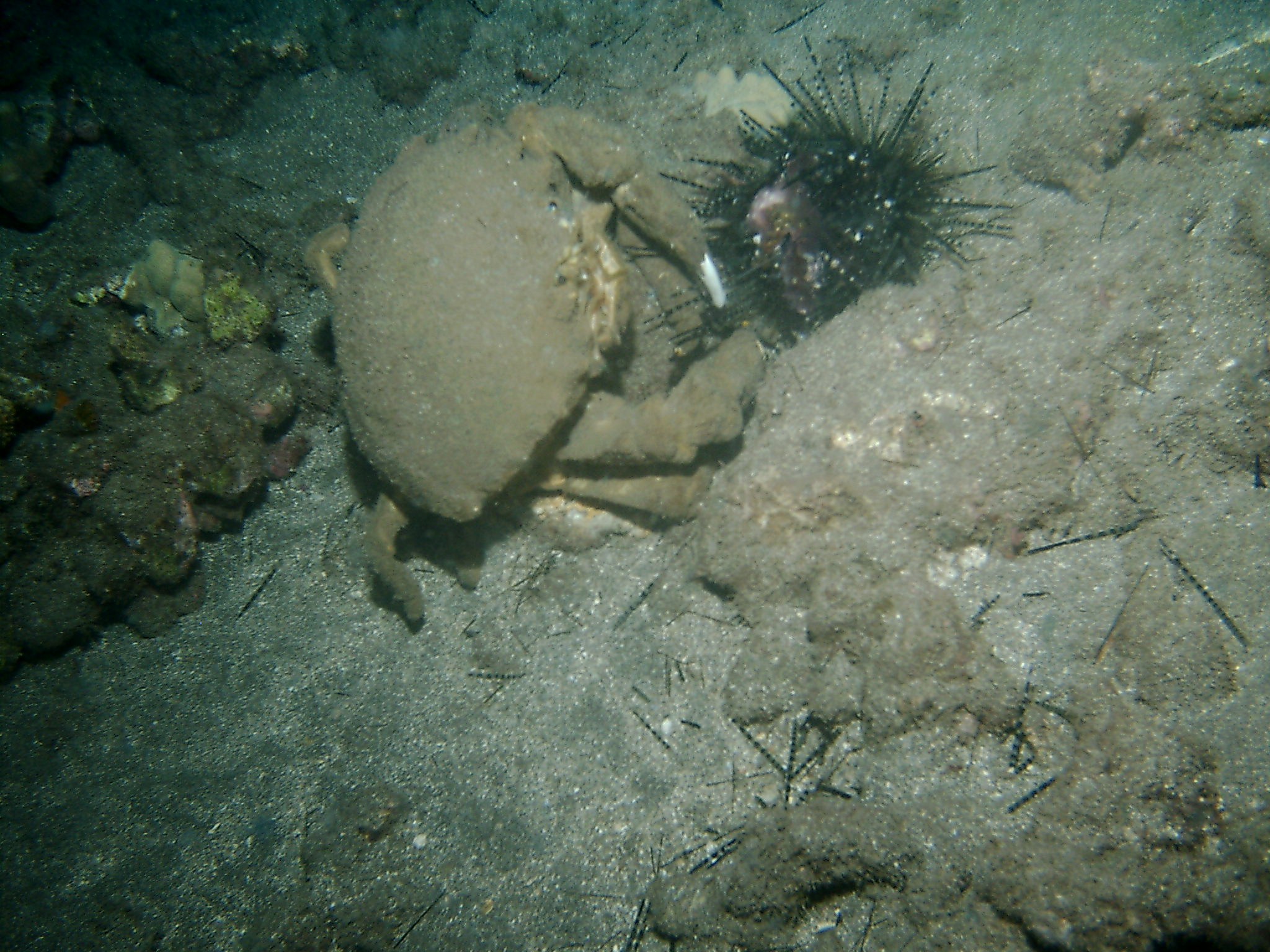
- T. dormia eating a sea urchin

Scientific classification
- Kingdom: Animalia
- Phylum: Arthropoda
- Class: Malacostraca
- Order: Decapoda
- Suborder: Pleocyemata
- Infraorder: Brachyura
- Family: Dromiidae
- Genus: Tumidodromia
- Species: T. dormia

Binomial name
- Tumidodromia dormia (Linnaeus, 1763)

Synonyms
- Cancer lanosus Rumphius, 1705; Cancer dormia Linnaeus, 1763; Dromidiopsis dormia (Linnaeus, 1763); Cancer dormitator Herbst, 1790; Dromia rumphii Weber, 1795; Dromia hirsutissima Dana, 1852

= Tumidodromia dormia =

Species of crab

Tumidodromia dormia, the sleepy sponge crab or common sponge crab, is the largest species of sponge crab and the only species in the genus Tumidodromia. It grows to a carapace width of 20 cm (8 in) and lives in shallow waters across the Indo-Pacific region.

== Distribution ==
Tumidodromia dormia has a widespread distribution in the Indo-Pacific region. Its range extends from East Africa (including Madagascar, the Seychelles and Mauritius) and the Red Sea through the Malay Archipelago, south to Queensland (Australia), north to China and Japan and as far east as Hawaii and French Polynesia. It is mostly found in shallow waters, with the deepest record being 112 m (367 ft).

== Description ==
Tumidodromia dormia is the largest species in the family Dromiidae, at up to 200 millimetres (7.9 in) across the carapace for males, and up to 172 mm (6.8 in) for females.

== Behaviour ==
Like other related crabs, T. dormia camouflages itself by carrying a sponge on its back, which it cuts to size with its claws, and then holds in place with its last two pairs of legs. Instead of a sponge, T. dormia has occasionally been observed carrying other materials, including a hollow piece of wood, and the sole of a discarded shoe.

== Life cycle ==
Little reproductive data is available for T. dormia. One ovigerous (egg-carrying) female from the Marquesas Islands was carrying around 130,000 eggs, each 0.5 mm in diameter.

== Taxonomic history ==
Tumidodromia dormia was among the first dromiid crabs to be collected, because of its large size and the fact that it occurs in shallow waters. It was first described by Carl Linnaeus in his 1763 work Centuria Insectorum, under the name Cancer Dormia. An earlier description was published by Georg Eberhard Rumphius in his 1705 work De Amboinsche Rariteitkamer, but this predates the starting point for zoological nomenclature. There are a number of related species, which have often been confused with each other, including "Dromia rumphii", some examples of which are now considered to belong to Lauridromia dehaani.
