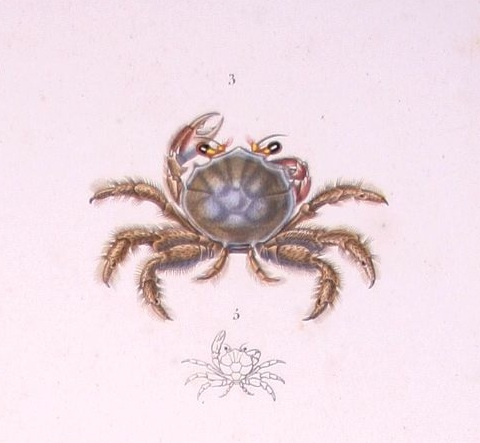
- Dynomene hispida

Scientific classification
- Kingdom: Animalia
- Phylum: Arthropoda
- Clade: Pancrustacea
- Class: Malacostraca
- Order: Decapoda
- Suborder: Pleocyemata
- Infraorder: Brachyura
- Superfamily: Dromioidea
- Family: Dynomenidae; Ortmann, 1892

Genera
- 19 (14 fossil, 5 extant), See below

= Dynomenidae =

Family of crabs

Dynomenidae is a family of crabs in the superfamily Dromioidea mostly found in Madagascar. There are nineteen genera in this family: five extant and fourteen known from fossils:

- Acanthodromia A. Milne-Edwards, 1880
- Dynomene Desmarest, 1823
- Hirsutodynomene McLay, 1999
- Metadynomene McLay, 1999
- Paradynomene Sakai, 1963
- †Acanthodiaulax Schweitzer et al., 2003
- †Basinotopus M'Coy, 1849
- †Cyamocarcinus Bittner, 1883
- †Dromiopsis Reuss, 1858
- †Dynomenopsis Secretan, 1972
- †Eotrachynotocarcinus Beschin et al., 2007
- †Gemmellarocarcinus Checchia-Rispoli, 1905
- †Graptocarcinus Roemer, 1887
- †Kierionopsis Davidson, 1966
- †Maurimia Martins-Neto, 2001
- †Ovamene Müller & Collins, 1991
- †Stephanometopon Bosquet, 1854
- †Trechmannius Collins & Donovan, 2006
- †Xandaros Bishop, 1988
