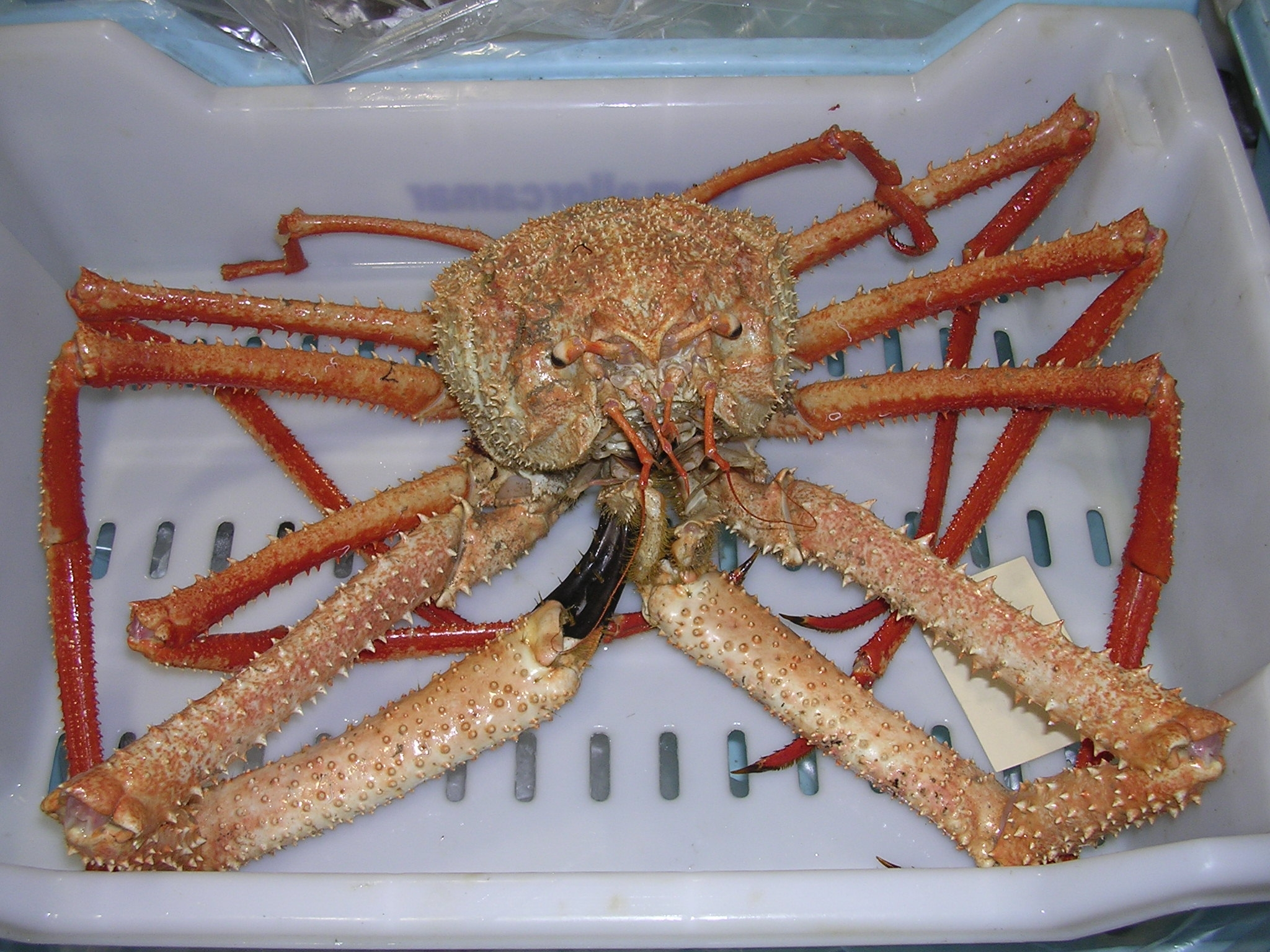
- Paromola cuvieri

Scientific classification
- Domain: Eukaryota
- Kingdom: Animalia
- Phylum: Arthropoda
- Class: Malacostraca
- Order: Decapoda
- Suborder: Pleocyemata
- Infraorder: Brachyura
- Section: Dromiacea
- Superfamily: Homoloidea
- Family: Homolidae; De Haan, 1839

= Homolidae =

Family of crabs

The family Homolidae, known as carrier crabs or porter crabs, contains 14 genera of marine crabs. They mostly live on the continental slope and continental shelf, and are rarely encountered. Members of the Homolidae have their fifth pereiopods (last pair of walking legs) in a sub-dorsal position, which allows them to hold objects in place over the rear half of the carapace. The objects carried include sponges, black corals and gorgonians, and this behaviour may be a defence mechanism against predators. Some species have been observed carrying living sea urchins in a symbiotic relationship which allows them to benefit from the protection of the urchin's dangerous spikes.

The genus was erected by Dutch zoologist Wilhem De Haan in 1839.

== Genera ==
A total of 14 genera are currently recognised in the family:

- Dagnaudus Guinot & Richer de Forges, 1995
- Gordonopsis Guinot & Richer de Forges, 1995
- Homola Leach, 1816
- Homolax Alcock, 1899
- Homolochunia Doflein, 1904
- Homologenus A. Milne-Edwards, in Henderson, 1888
- Homolomannia Ihle, 1912
- Ihlopsis Guinot & Richer de Forges, 1995
- Lamoha Ng, 1998
- Latreillopsis Henderson, 1888
- Moloha Barnard, 1947
- Paromola Wood-Mason & Alcock, 1891
- Paromolopsis Wood-Mason & Alcock, 1891
- Yaldwynopsis Guinot & Richer de Forges, 1995
