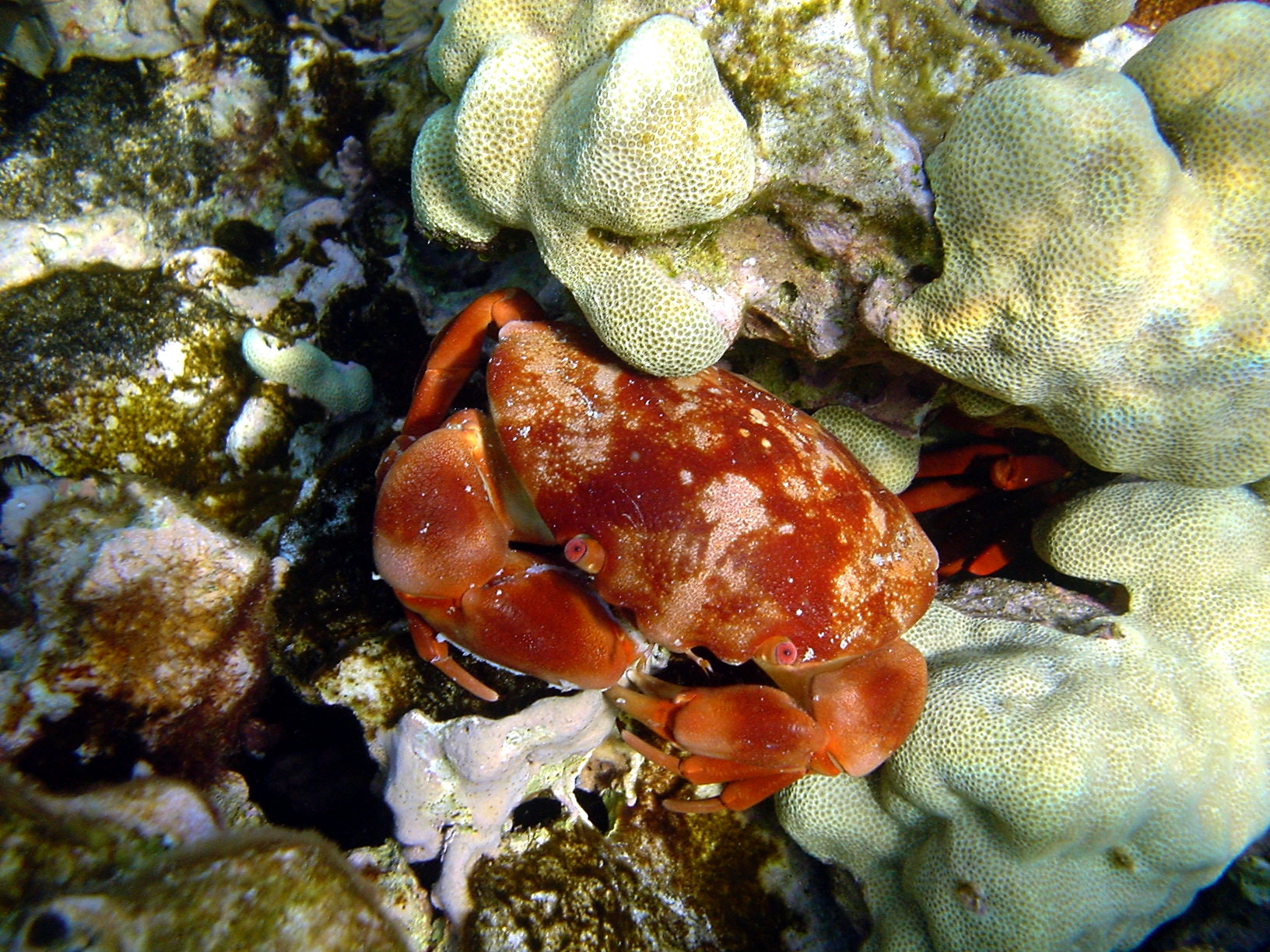

Scientific classification
- Domain: Eukaryota
- Kingdom: Animalia
- Phylum: Arthropoda
- Class: Malacostraca
- Order: Decapoda
- Suborder: Pleocyemata
- Infraorder: Brachyura
- Family: Carpiliidae
- Genus: Carpilius
- Species: C. convexus

Binomial name
- Carpilius convexus (Forsskål, 1775)

Synonyms
- Cancer convexus Forsskål, 1775; Cancer adspersus Herbst, 1790; Cancer petraeus Herbst, 1801

= Carpilius convexus =

Species of crab

Carpilius convexus, commonly known as the marbled stone crab, is a species of crab found in the Indo-Pacific, from Hawaii to the Red Sea and South Africa. It was first described by Peter Forsskål in 1775 as "Cancer convexus", and has sometimes been treated as a variety of the larger species Carpilius maculatus. The biology of the genus Carpilius is poorly known. The coloration of Carpilius convexus is a yellow-brown or red, with patches that are mainly brown, growing up to 25 cm (9.8 in). Despite us knowing their size, coloration, and habitat, little else is known about their biology.

== Gallery ==
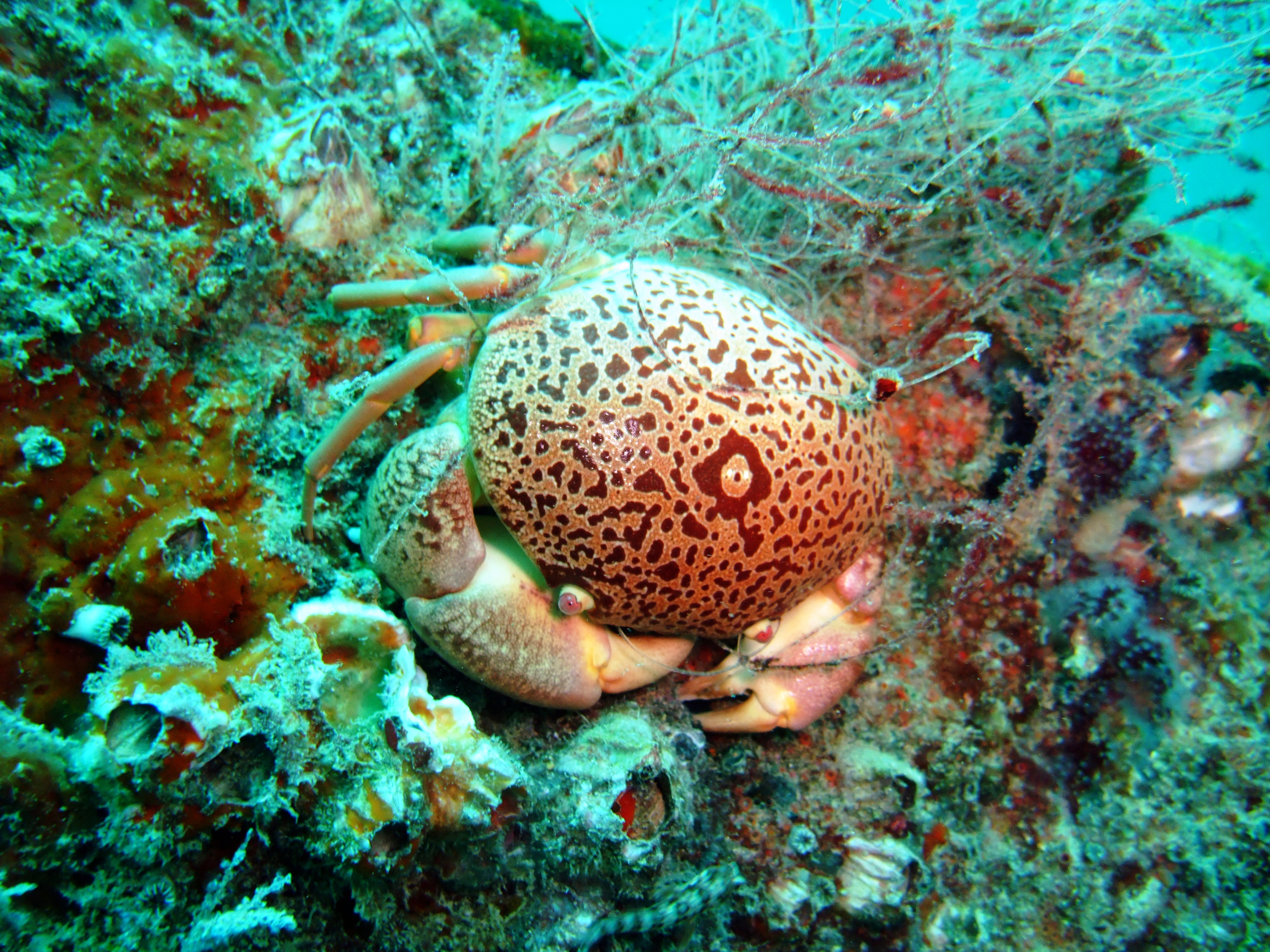
Carpilius convexus (Male), Anterior view, Ludwig Wreck, Persian Gulf, 2012.

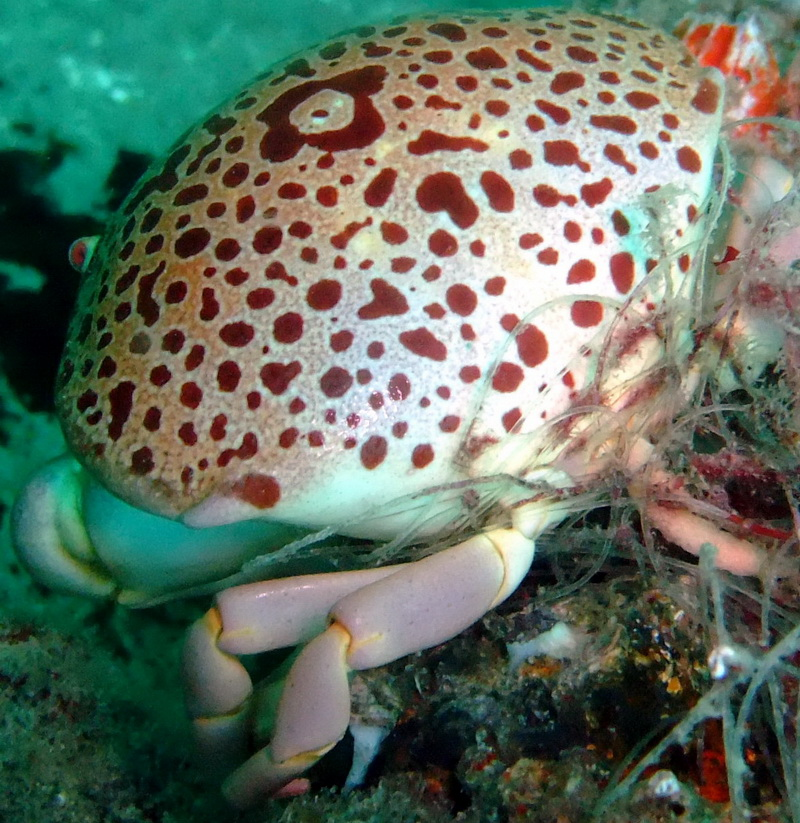
Carpilius convexus (Male), Posterior view, Ludwig Wreck, Persian Gulf, 2012.

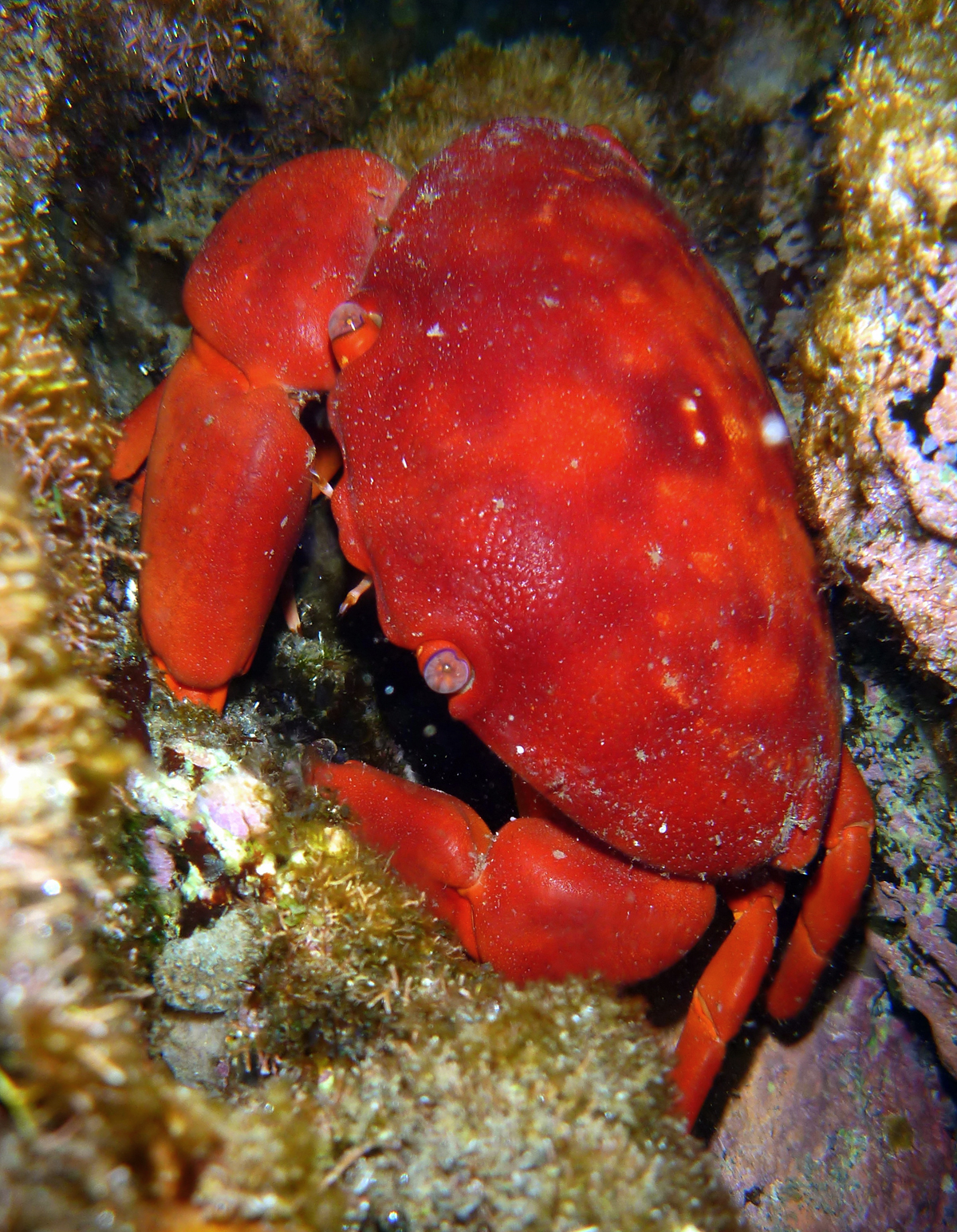
Carpilius convexus (Female), Réunion.
