= Harpactocarcinus yozgatensis =

Harpactocarcinus yozgatensis Temporal range: Ypresian

Scientific classification
- Domain: Eukaryota
- Kingdom: Animalia
- Phylum: Arthropoda
- Class: Malacostraca
- Order: Decapoda
- Suborder: Pleocyemata
- Infraorder: Brachyura
- Family: †Zanthopsidae
- Genus: †Harpactocarcinus
- Species: †H. yozgatensis

Binomial name
- †Harpactocarcinus yozgatensis Schweitzer, Shirk, Ćosocić, Okan, Feldmann & Hoşgör, 2007

Extinct species of crab

Harpactocarcinus yozgatensis is an extinct species of crab in the family Zanthopsidae. It was first described in 2007 from a bed of limestone dating to the Cuisian Eocene near the city of Yozgat in central Turkey.

== Description ==
Harpactocarcinus yozgatensis has a densely punctate carapace which is approximately 0.8x as long as it is wide and features four frontal spines and ten to thirteen small, anterolateral ones. Like other species of Harpactocarcinus, it exhibits moderate heterochely, having a larger right cheliped than its left. It has very deep orbits which can – in conjunction with its small chelae – distinguish it from other species of Harpactocarcinus.

The excellent preservation of H. yozgatensis presented the first robust description of the abdomen of Harpactocarcinus. The male abdomen's segments are narrow, whereas the female's are convex and broad. The first and second segments of the abdomen are fused in both sexes, and in males, the third through fifth segments are also fused.
