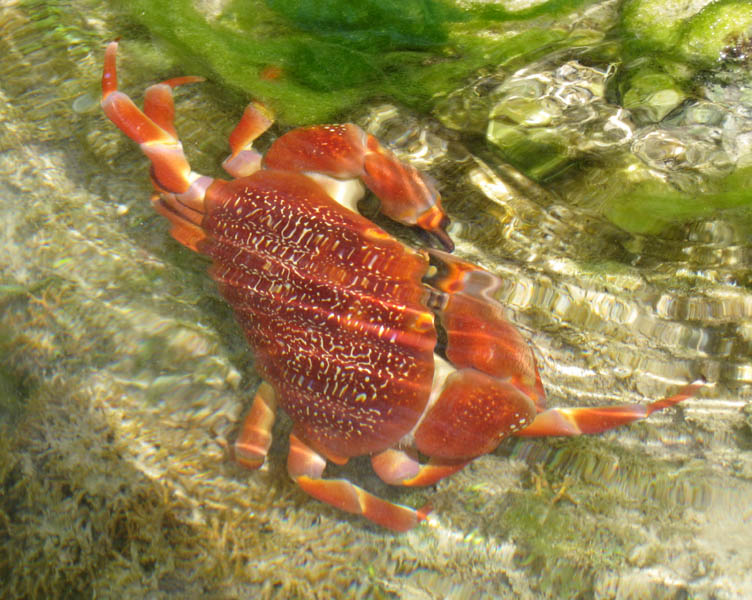

Scientific classification
- Kingdom: Animalia
- Phylum: Arthropoda
- Clade: Pancrustacea
- Class: Malacostraca
- Order: Decapoda
- Suborder: Pleocyemata
- Infraorder: Brachyura
- Family: Carpiliidae
- Genus: Carpilius
- Species: C. corallinus

Binomial name
- Carpilius corallinus (Herbst, 1783)

= Carpilius corallinus =

Batwing coral crab

Species of crustacean

Carpilius corallinus, commonly known as the batwing coral crab, is a species of crab in the family Carpiliidae.

The batwing coral crab is widespread throughout the tropical waters of the western Atlantic Ocean from the coast of Florida south to Brazil including the Gulf of Mexico and the Caribbean Sea. It is the largest crab found within this geographic area, and is edible.
