= Harpactocarcinus dalmatius =

Harpactocarcinus dalmatius Temporal range: Bartonian

Scientific classification
- Domain: Eukaryota
- Kingdom: Animalia
- Phylum: Arthropoda
- Class: Malacostraca
- Order: Decapoda
- Suborder: Pleocyemata
- Infraorder: Brachyura
- Family: †Zanthopsidae
- Genus: †Harpactocarcinus
- Species: †H. dalmatius

Binomial name
- †Harpactocarcinus dalmatius Schweitzer, Shirk, Ćosocić, Okan, Feldmann & Hoşgör, 2007

Extinct species of crab

Harpactocarcinus dalmatius is an extinct species of crab in the family Zanthopsidae. It was first described in 2007 from a coastal exposure of foraminiferal limestone dating to the Bartonian Eocene on the island of Hvar in Croatia.

== Description ==
Harpactocarcinus dalmatius has a subovate, finely punctate carapace which is approximately 0.7x as long as it is wide and features four frontal spines and thirteen small, anterolateral ones. It measures 5.30 cm (2.09 in) in width excluding spines and 3.71 cm (1.46 in) in length. It has very shallow orbits which – in conjunction with small ridges extending down its midline starting from the eleventh spine – distinguish it from other species of Harpactocarcinus. Like other species of Harpactocarcinus, it exhibits heterochely, having a larger right cheliped than its left.
