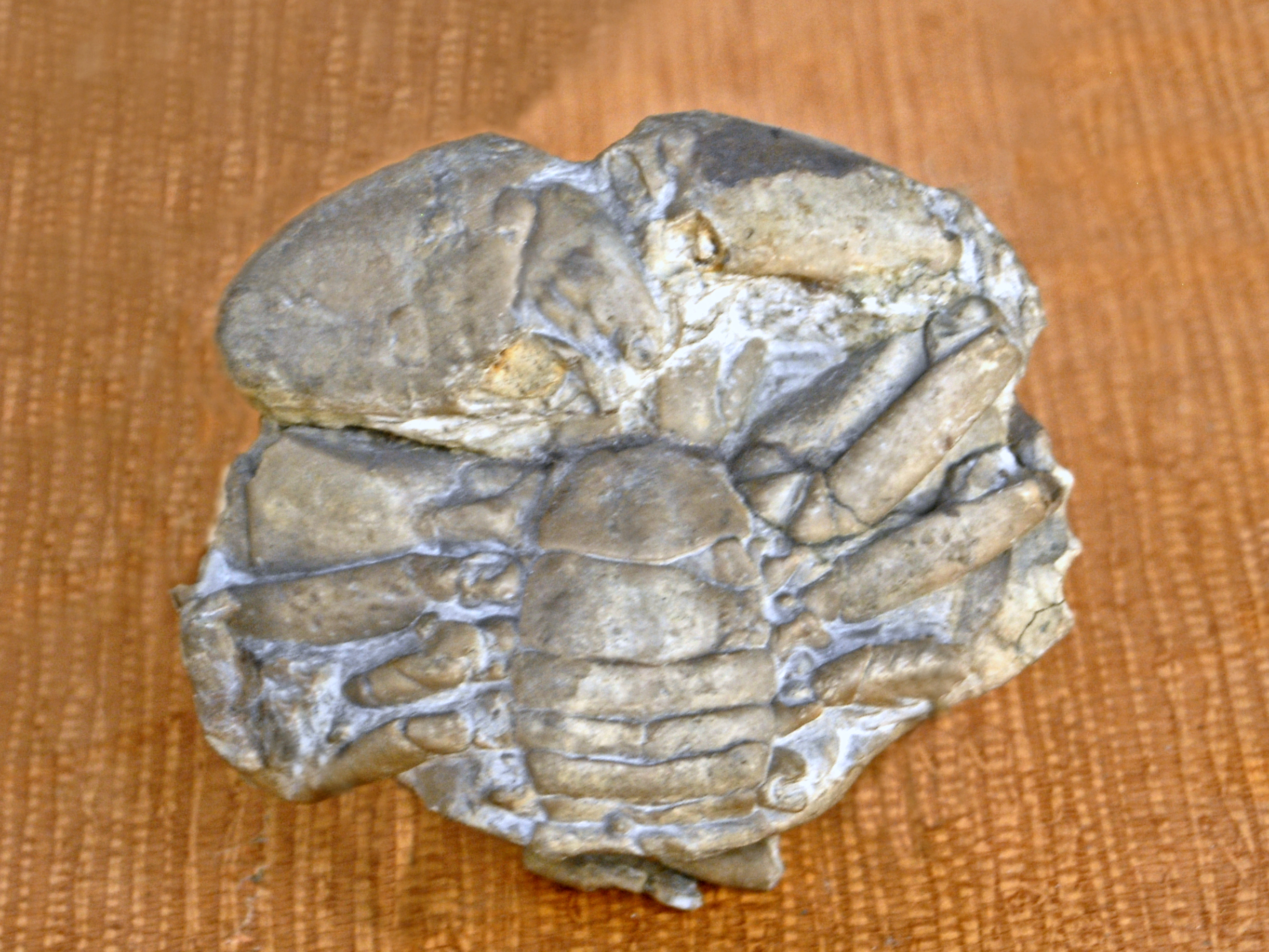
- Paleocarpilius macrocheilus from Italy, on display at Galerie de paléontologie et d'anatomie comparée in Paris

Scientific classification
- Kingdom: Animalia
- Phylum: Arthropoda
- Class: Malacostraca
- Order: Decapoda
- Suborder: Pleocyemata
- Infraorder: Brachyura
- Family: Carpiliidae
- Genus: †Palaeocarpilius; A. Milne-Edwards, 1862

= Palaeocarpilius =

Palaeocarpilius Temporal range: Eocene–Oligocene

Extinct genus of crabs

Palaeocarpilius is an extinct genus of crabs belonging to the family Carpiliidae. The type species of this genus is Palaeocarpilius macrocheilus.

These epifaunal carnivores lived in the Eocene and the Oligocene, from 48.6 to 28.4 Ma.

== Species ==
The following species are recognized:

- Palaeocarpilius aquitanicus Milne-Edwards 1862
- Palaeocarpilius aquilinus Collins & Morris 1973
- Palaeocarpilius ignotus Milne-Edwards 1862
- Palaeocarpilius intermedius Stubblefield 1927
- Palaeocarpilius laevis Imaizumi 1939
- Palaeocarpilius macrocheilus Desmarest 1822
- Palaeocarpilius mississippiensis Rathbun 1935
- Palaeocarpilius rugifer Stoliczka 1871
- Palaeocarpilius valrovinensis De Gregorio 1895

== Distribution ==
Fossils of this genus have been found in the Eocene of Italy and in the Oligocene of India, Libya and United States.
