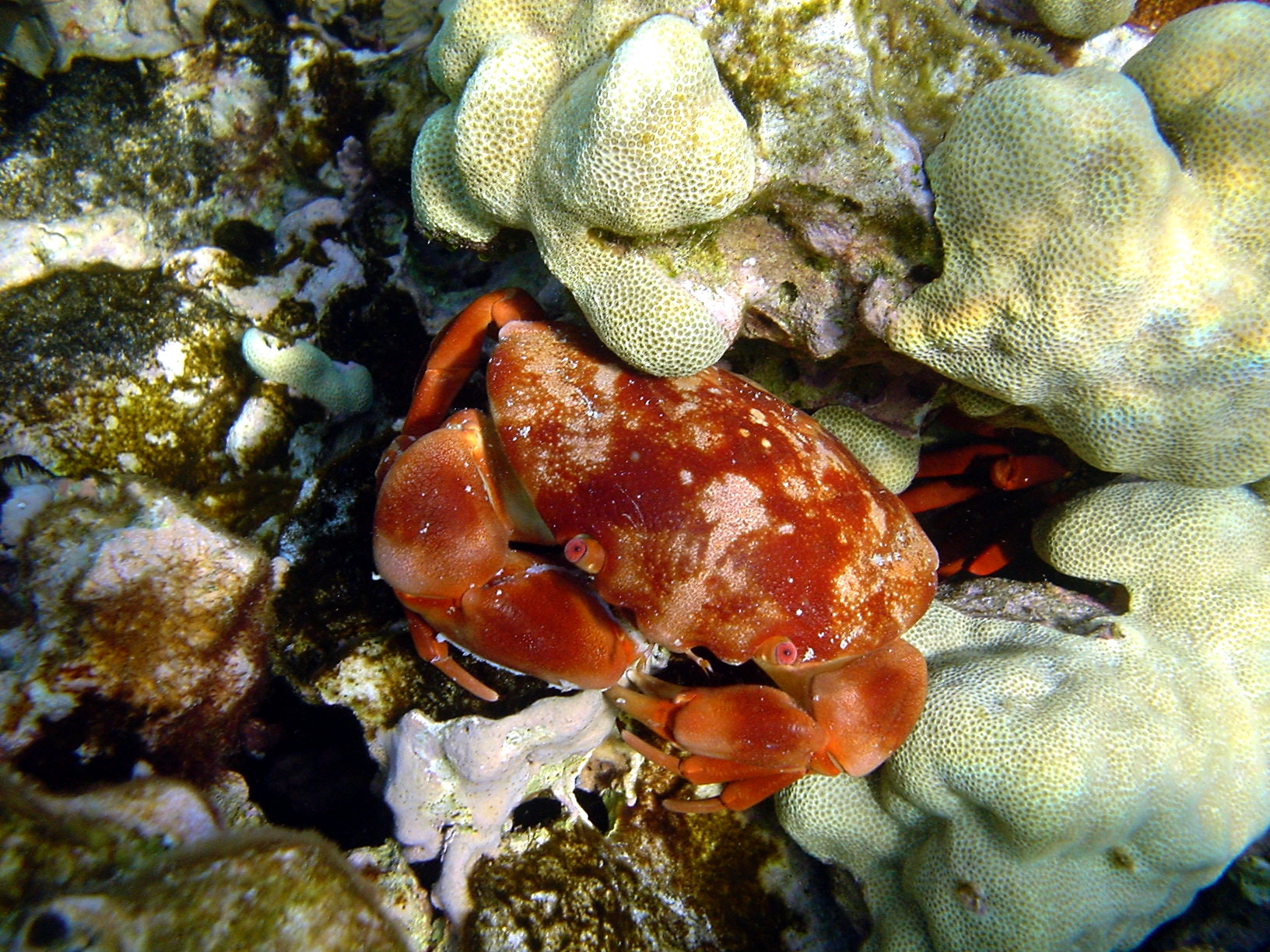
- Carpilius convexus

Scientific classification
- Domain: Eukaryota
- Kingdom: Animalia
- Phylum: Arthropoda
- Class: Malacostraca
- Order: Decapoda
- Suborder: Pleocyemata
- Infraorder: Brachyura
- Family: Carpiliidae
- Genus: Carpilius; Desmarest, 1823

= Carpilius =

Genus of crabs

Carpilius is a genus of crabs in the family Carpiliidae, containing the following species:

Image	Scientific name	Distribution
	† Carpilius cantellii De Angeli & Alberti, 2021	Vicenza, Italy
	Carpilius convexus (Forskål, 1775)	Indo-Pacific, from Hawaii to the Red Sea and South Africa
	Carpilius corallinus (Herbst, 1783)	western Atlantic Ocean from the coast of Florida to Brazil including the Gulf of Mexico and the Caribbean Sea
	† Carpilius lwangi Hu & Tao, 2000	
	Carpilius maculatus (Linnaeus, 1758)	from Hawaii to Mozambique and South Africa
	† Carpilius petreus Beschin, Busulini, De Angeli & Tessier, 2007	
