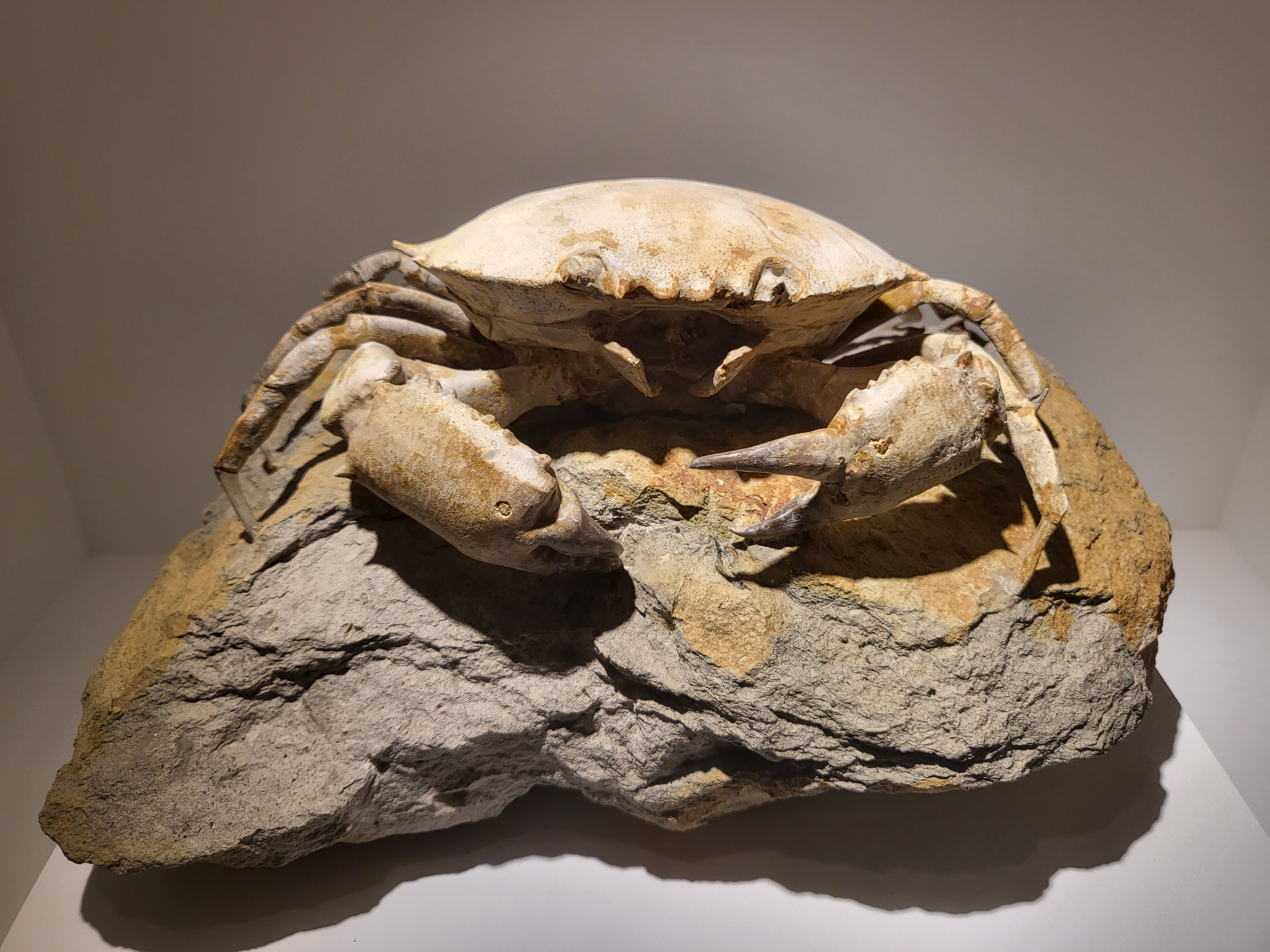
- Harpactocarcinus punctulatus at the Houston Museum of Natural Science

Scientific classification
- Domain: Eukaryota
- Kingdom: Animalia
- Phylum: Arthropoda
- Class: Malacostraca
- Order: Decapoda
- Suborder: Pleocyemata
- Infraorder: Brachyura
- Section: Eubrachyura
- Subsection: Heterotremata
- Superfamily: Carpilioidea
- Family: †Zanthopsidae
- Genus: †Harpactocarcinus; A. Milne-Edwards, 1862

= Harpactocarcinus =

Harpactocarcinus Temporal range: Cretaceous to Miocene, 66–11.6 Ma

Extinct genus of crabs

Harpactocarcinus is an extinct genus of mud crabs.

== Fossil record ==
This genus is known in the fossil record from the end of the Cretaceous to the Miocene. Fossils within this genus have been found in Iran, Europe, Turkey, Mexico, United States and New Zealand.

== Species ==
- †Harpactocarcinus almerae Via, 1941
- †Harpactocarcinus americanus Rathbun, 1928
- †Harpactocarcinus dalmatius Schweitzer et al., 2007
- †Harpactocarcinus fedrigoi Beshin, De Angeli & Zorzin, 2014
- †Harpactocarcinus istriensis Bachmayer and Nosan, 1959
- †Harpactocarcinus jacquoti Milne-Edwards, 1865
- †Harpactocarcinus macrodactylus Milne-Edwards, 1850
- †Harpactocarcinus miocenicus Vega et al., 2010
- †Harpactocarcinus multidentatus Stubblefield, 1946
- †Harpactocarcinus ovalis Milne-Edwards, 1862
- †Harpactocarcinus punctulatus Milne-Edwards, 1862
- †Harpactocarcinus rotundatus Milne-Edwards, 1862
- †Harpactocarcinus wilkeningi Bachmayer and Mundlos, 1968
- †Harpactocarcinus yozgatensis Schweitzer et al., 2007
