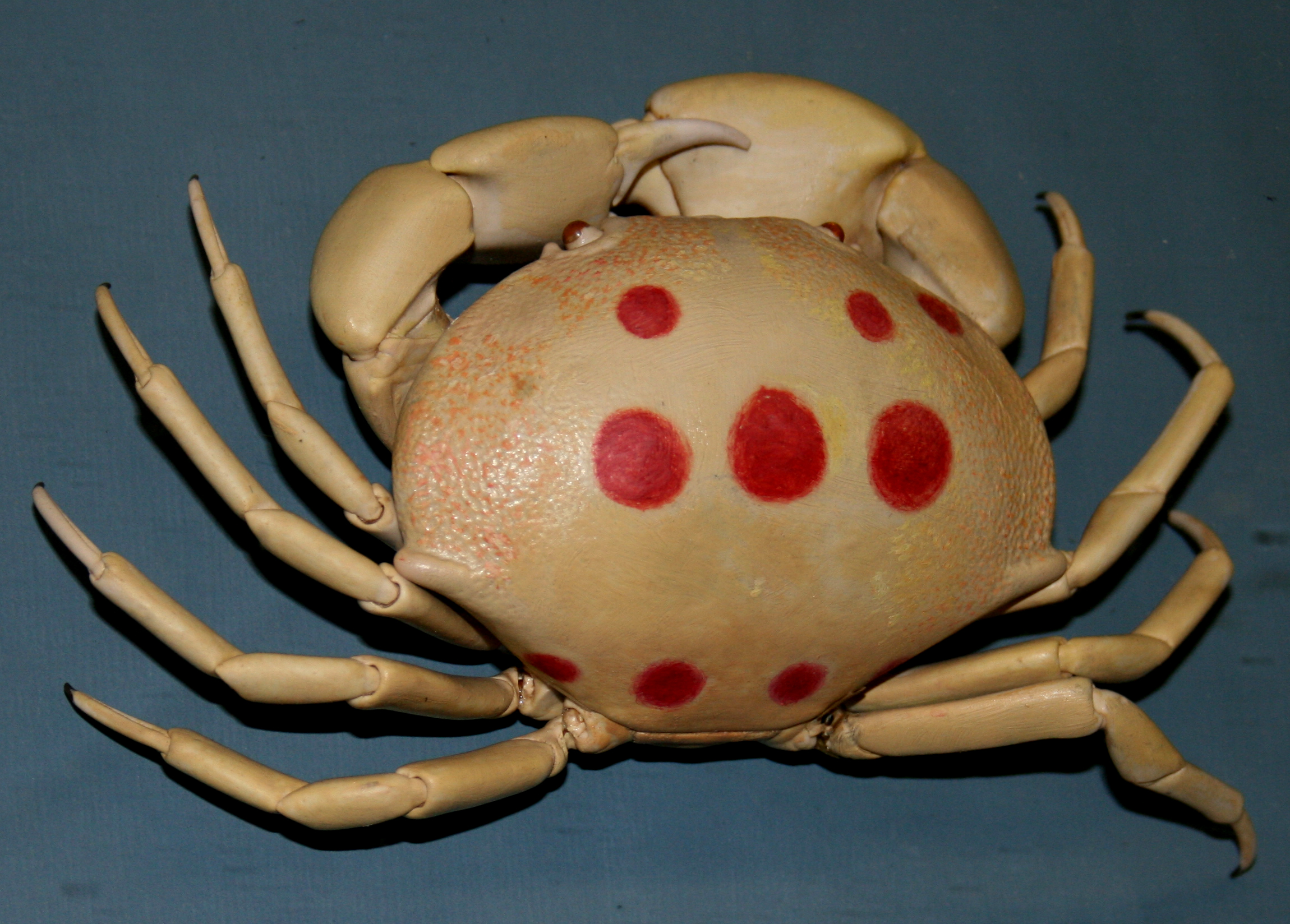

Scientific classification
- Kingdom: Animalia
- Phylum: Arthropoda
- Clade: Pancrustacea
- Class: Malacostraca
- Order: Decapoda
- Suborder: Pleocyemata
- Infraorder: Brachyura
- Family: Carpiliidae
- Genus: Carpilius
- Species: C. maculatus

Binomial name
- Carpilius maculatus (Linnaeus, 1758)

Synonyms
- Cancer maculatus Linnaeus, 1758

= Carpilius maculatus =

Species of crab

Carpilius maculatus, common names seven-eleven crab, spotted reef crab, dark-finger coral crab, and large spotted crab, is a species of crab in the family Carpiliidae, which also includes C. convexus and C. corallinus. While there have reports of the C. maculatus as being poisonous, biochemical testing has revealed that they lack any paralytic shellfish toxins.

== Description ==
It is the most prominent of the genus Carpilius, due to its ability to be easily identified by the presence of eleven bright red spots located on its cream-colored carapace. The spots are placed in a 2-3-4 design, with two at the front of its carapace, three across the middle, and four located at its posterior end. This species grows to approximately 18 cm. At an average carapace width of 152 mm, it is larger in size in regards to other xanthids. The C. maculatus has a smooth carapace and general appearance, with the exception of four protruding spines located between its eyes.

== Habitat ==
These crabs are typically found on coral and rocky reef substrates generally in the Indo-West Pacific. Yet, these crabs are also found outside of the Indo-West Pacific region, with findings of C. maculatus reported from Hawaii to Mozambique and South Africa. The closely related Carpilius convexus is also generally found in the Indo-West Pacific region, whereas the Carpilius corallinus is located primarily in the central western Atlantic Ocean. The C. maculatus is nocturnal in nature, actively scavenging at night along the ocean floor.

== Feeding ==
The nocturnal nature of the Carpilius maculatus leads it to hunt primarily at night, with its diet consisting mainly of marine snails. Observations of feeding behavior revealed that Carpilius maculatus initially attack the legs or small claws of its prey, before utilizing its master claw in order to crush the shells of its prey. There was no distinct difference between the manus heights and thicknesses between females and males of the species. The larger size of these master claws allows the C. maculatus to feed efficiently on bigger members of its prey species. In general, C. maculatus tends to avoid consuming smaller-sized prey (< 10 mm). Proximal molars are located on these master claws that aid it in its shell- and spire-crushing behavior.

== Phylogenetic Relationships ==
While scientists previously grouped the genus Carpilius with other crabs of the Xanthiae family, recent research on mitochondrial gene fragments of the Carpilius crabs has granted it its status as a separate monotypic genus within its distinct family, Carpiliidae. Fossil records of crabs classified within the family Carpiliidae have linked it to the genera Palaeocarpilius, which was present during the middle to upper Eocene Epoch approximately 56 million years ago and found in what is now modern-day Europe, India, and Egypt. The family Carpiliidae has also been associated with the Harpactoxanthopsis of Europe – a now extinct family located within the superfamily Carpilioidea. This fossil record, however, is insufficient to establish a biological origination point for the group. Mitogenome analysis of C. maculatus has also allowed scientists to place Carpilius maculatus within the Heterotremata species, a clade of freshwater crabs.
