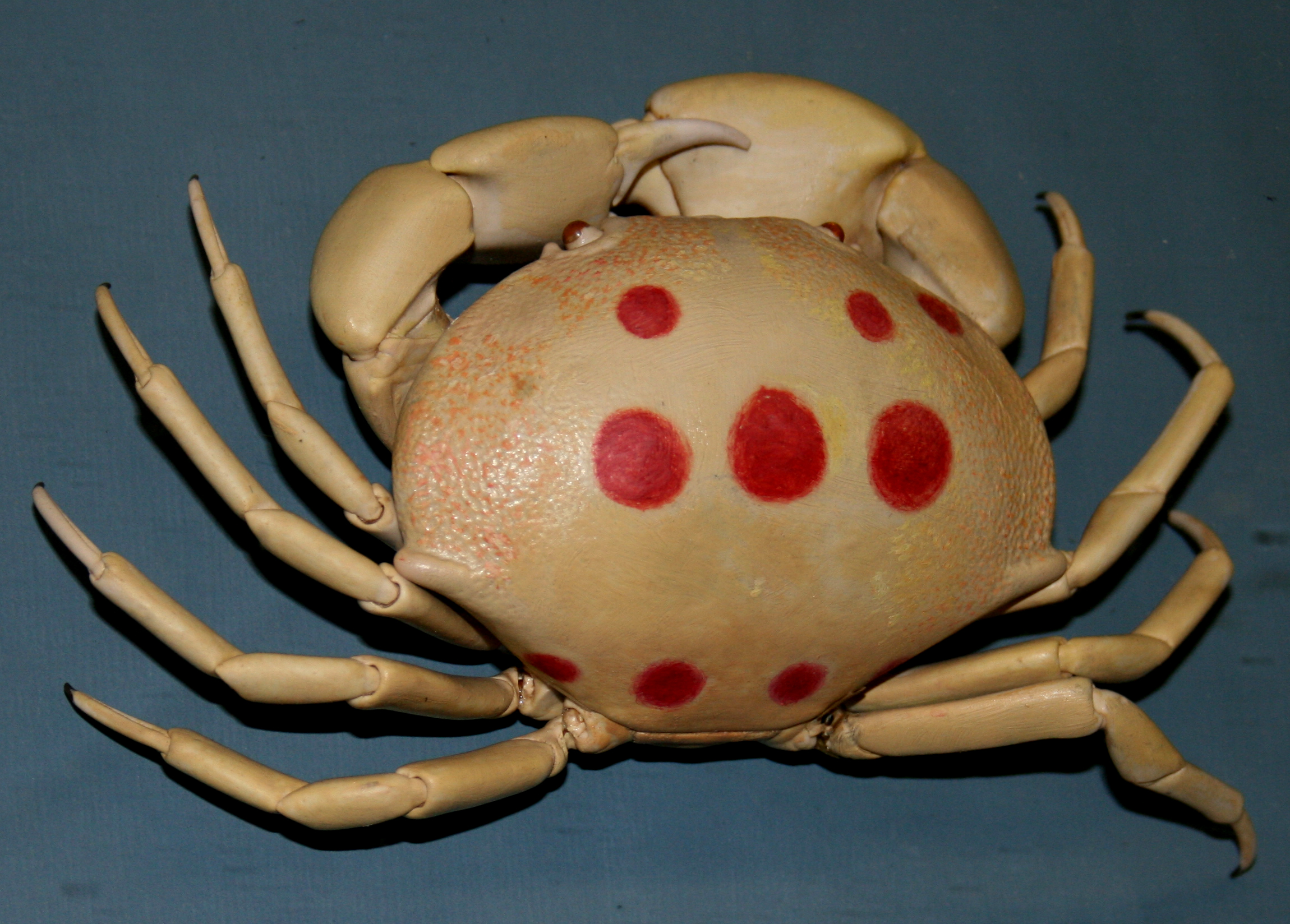
- Carpilius maculatus

Scientific classification
- Kingdom: Animalia
- Phylum: Arthropoda
- Clade: Pancrustacea
- Class: Malacostraca
- Order: Decapoda
- Suborder: Pleocyemata
- Clade: Reptantia
- Infraorder: Brachyura
- Section: Eubrachyura
- Subsection: Heterotremata
- Superfamily: Carpilioidea (Ortmann, 1893)

Families
- †Arabicarcinidae Schweitzer & Feldmann, 2017; Carpiliidae Ortmann, 1893; †Paleoxanthopsidae Schweitzer, 2003; †Tumidocarcinidae Schweitzer, 2005; †Zanthopsidae Vía Boada, 1959

= Carpilioidea =

Carpilioidea Temporal range: Maastrichtian–Recent

Superfamily of crabs

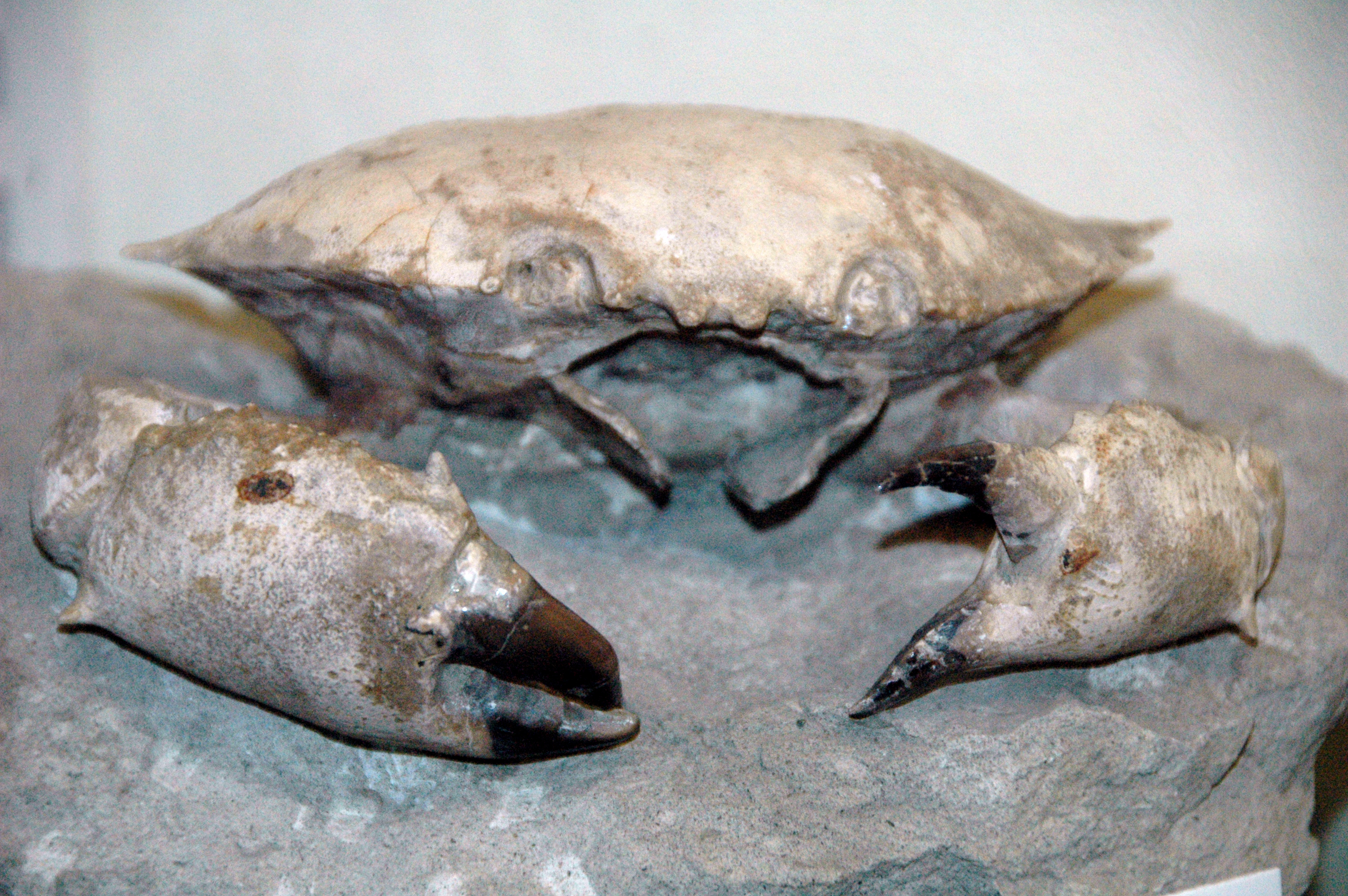
Harpactoxanthopsis quadrilobata fossil, Middle Eocene, Venetia Region, northern Italy

Carpilioidea is a superfamily of crabs containing a single extant family, Carpiliidae and four extinct families. The modern range of the family includes the Indo-Pacific, Western Atlantic and Caribbean Sea. The fossil record of the group extends back at least as far as the Paleocene.

== Genera ==
†Arabicarcinidae Schweitzer & Feldmann, 2017

- †Arabicarcinus Schweitzer & Feldmann, 2017
- †Eomatuta De Angeli & Marchiori, 2009

Carpiliidae Ortmann, 1893

- †Braggicarpilius Beschin, Busulini & Tessier, 2015
- †Bryocarpilius Feldmann, Schweitzer, Bennett, Franţescu, Resar & Trudeau, 2011
- Carpilius A. G. Desmarest, 1823
- †Corallicarpilius De Angeli & Ceccon, 2015
- †Eocarpilius Blow & Manning, 1996
- †Holcocarcinus Withers, 1924
- †Laticarpilius Feldmann, Schweitzer, Bennett, Franţescu, Resar & Trudeau, 2011
- †Liopsalis von Meyer, 1862
- †Lovaracarpilius Beschin, De Angeli, Checchi & Zarantonello, 2016
- †Maurocarpilius Ossó, Gagnaison & Bailleul, 2020
- †Montemagralia De Angeli & Ceccon, 2016
- †Ocalina Rathbun, 1929
- †Oscacarpilius Artal & Van Bakel, 2018
- †Palaeocarpilius A. Milne-Edwards, 1862
- †Paraocalina Beschin, Busulini, De Angeli & Tessier, 2007
- †Proxicarpilius Collins & Morris, 1978
- †Tethyscarpilius De Angeli & Alberti, 2016

†Paleoxanthopsidae Schweitzer, 2003

- †Jakobsenius Schweitzer, 2005
- †Lobulata Schweitzer, Feldmann & Gingerich, 2004
- †Palaeoxantho Bishop, 1986
- †Palaeoxanthopsis Beurlen, 1958
- †Paraverrucoides Schweitzer, 2003
- †Remia Schweitzer, 2003
- †Rocacarcinus Schweitzer, 2005
- †Verrucoides Vega, Cosma, Coutiño, Feldmann, Nyborg, Schweitzer & Waugh, 2001

†Tumidocarcinidae Schweitzer, 2005

- †Agostella Ossó-Morales, 2011
- †Baricarcinus Casadío, De Angeli, Feldmann, Garassino, Hetler, Parras & Schweitzer, 2004
- †Cyclocorystes Bell, 1858
- †Dynomenopsis Secrétan, 1972
- †Lobonotus A. Milne-Edwards, 1863
- †Nitotacarcinus Schweitzer, Artal, Van Bakel, Jagt & Karasawa, 2007
- †Paratumidocarcinus Martins-Neto, 2001
- †Paronacarcinus Beschin, Busulini & Tessier, 2009
- †Pulalius Schweitzer, Feldmann, Tucker & Berglund, 2000
- †Romualdocarcinus Prado & Luque in Prado, Luque, Barreto & Palmer, 2018
- †Styracocarcinus Schweitzer & Feldmann, 2012
- †Titanocarcinus A. Milne-Edwards, 1863
- †Tumidocarcinus Glaessner, 1960
- †Xanthilites Bell, 1858

†Zanthopsidae Vía Boada, 1959

- †Amekicarcinus Schweitzer, Odumodu & Feldmann, 2016
- †Fredericia Collins & Jakobsen, 2003
- †Harpactocarcinus A. Milne-Edwards, 1862
- †Harpactoxanthopsis Vía Boada, 1959
- †Martinetta Blow & Manning, 1997
- †Neozanthopsis Schweitzer, 2003
- †Zanthopsis M’Coy, 1849
