= Prawn =

Common name applied to some types of crustaceans

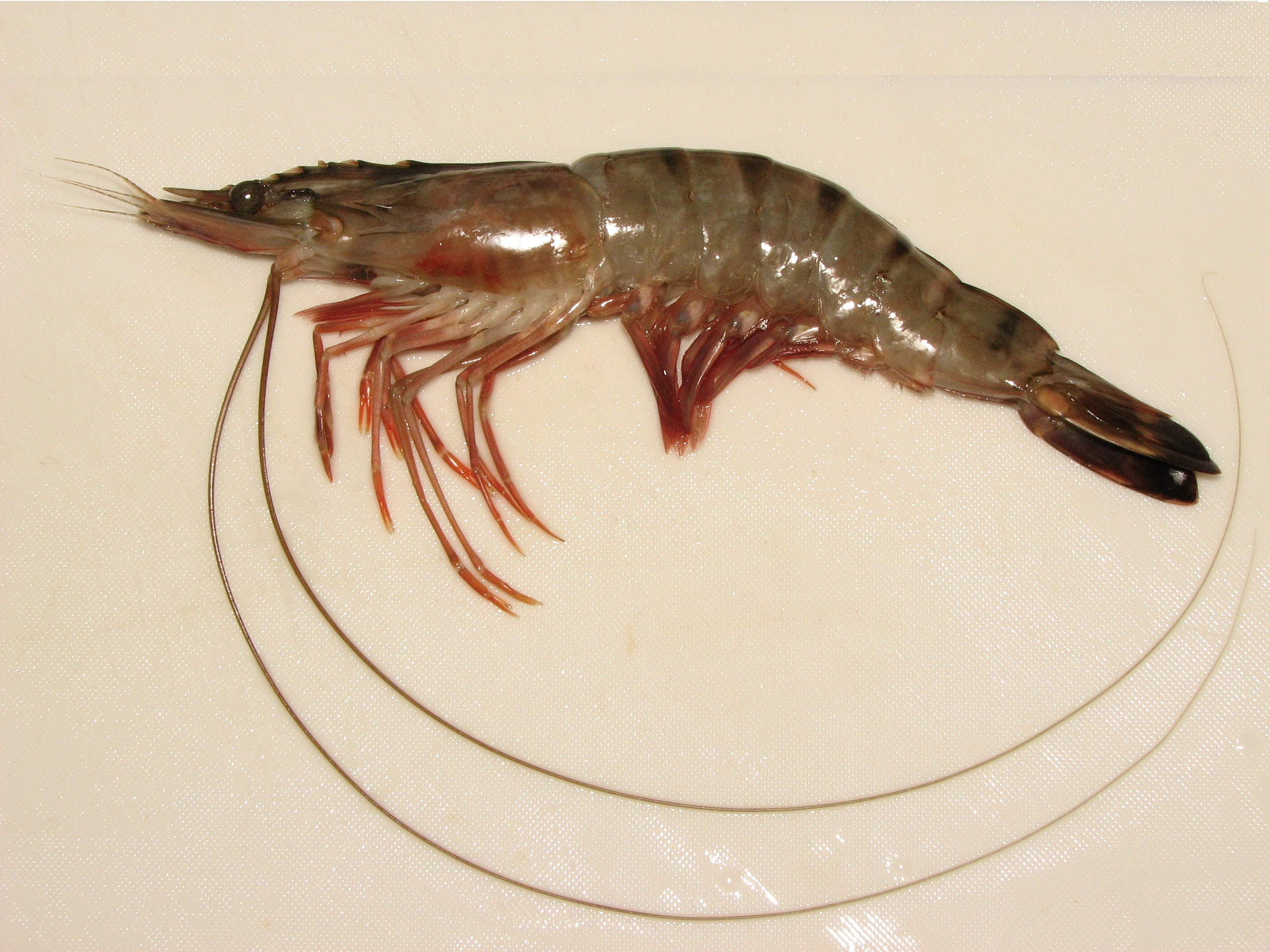
The giant tiger prawn (Penaeus monodon) is an important species for aquaculture.

Prawn is a common name for small aquatic crustaceans, often specifically larger shrimp, with an exoskeleton and ten legs (members of the order of decapods). Some prawns are edible for human consumption.

The term prawn is used particularly in the United Kingdom, Ireland, Commonwealth nations, and the northeastern United States for large swimming crustaceans or shrimp, especially those with commercial significance in the fishing industry. Shrimp in this category often belong to the suborder Dendrobranchiata, but also sometimes to Caridea within the suborder Pleocyemata. In the rest of North America, the term is used less frequently, typically for large or freshwater shrimp. The terms shrimp and prawn themselves lack scientific definition. Over the years, the way they are used has changed, and in contemporary usage, the terms are almost interchangeable.

== Shrimp vs. prawn ==
Shrimp and prawn

From Raymond Bauer in Remarkable Shrimps:

- Shrimp is characteristically used to refer to those crustaceans with long antennae, slender legs, and a laterally compressed, muscular abdomen that is highly adapted for both forward swimming and a backward (retrograde) escape response.
- Prawn is often used as a synonym of shrimp for penaeoidean and caridean shrimp, especially those of large size.

From the English Oxford Dictionaries:

- Shrimp: a small free-swimming crustacean with an elongated body, typically marine and frequently of commercial importance as food.
- Prawn: a marine crustacean which resembles a large shrimp.

The terms shrimp and prawn are common names, not scientific names. They are vernacular or colloquial terms, which lack the formal definition of scientific terms. They are not taxa, but are terms of convenience with little circumscriptional significance. There is no reason to avoid using the terms shrimp or prawn when convenient, but it is important not to confuse them with the names or relationships of actual taxa.

According to the crustacean taxonomist Tin-Yam Chan, "The terms shrimp and prawn have no definite reference to any known taxonomic groups. Although the term shrimp is sometimes applied to smaller species, while prawn is more often used for larger forms, there is no clear distinction between both terms and their usage is often confused or even reverse in different countries or regions." Writing in 1980, L. B. Holthuis noted that the terms prawn and shrimp were used inconsistently "even within a single region", generalising that larger species fished commercially were generally called shrimp in the United States, and prawns in other English-speaking countries, although not without exceptions.

Much confusion surrounds the scope of the term shrimp. Part of the confusion originates with the word's association with smallness; many shrimp species are small, about 2 cm (0.79 in) long, but some shrimp exceed 25 cm (9.8 in), such as Penaeus monodon. The expression "jumbo shrimp" can be viewed as an oxymoron, a problem that does not exist with the commercial designation "jumbo prawns". Larger shrimp are more likely to be targeted commercially and are often referred to as prawns, particularly in the Commonwealth of Nations.

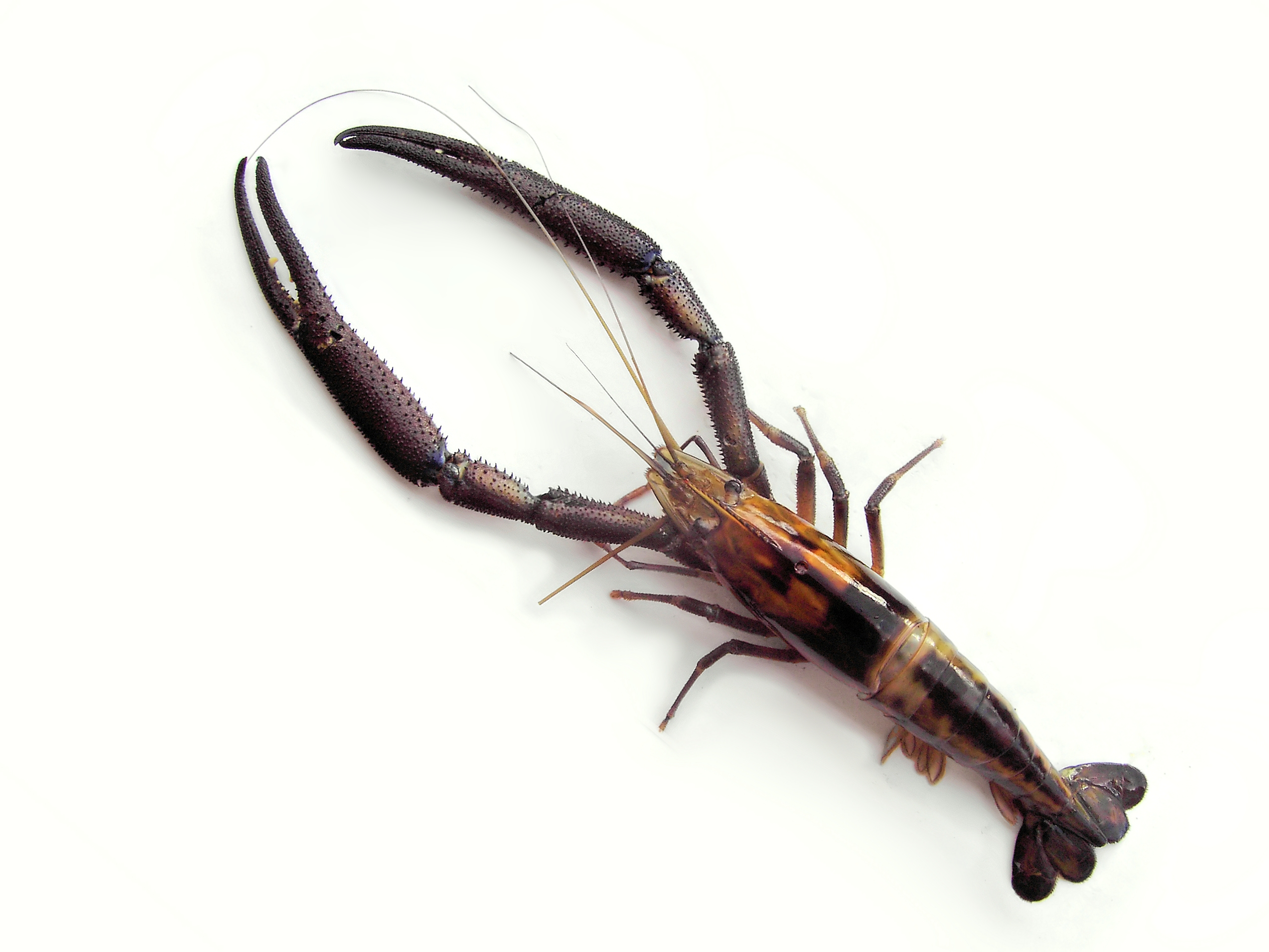
A bigclaw river shrimp from the Neotropics. Prawns are sometimes stated to be "large shrimp" or alternatively "freshwater shrimp", but this large-bodied, freshwater crustacean is a caridean shrimp, and is rarely referred to as a prawn.

The term shrimp originated around the 14th century with the Middle English shrimpe, akin to the Middle Low German schrempen, and meaning 'to contract or wrinkle'; and the Old Norse skorpna, meaning 'to shrivel up', or skreppa, meaning 'a thin person'. It is not clear where the term prawn originated, but early forms of the word surfaced in England in the early 15th century as prayne, praine and prane. According to the linguist Anatoly Liberman it is unclear how shrimp, in English, came to be associated with small, since no other language with Germanic origins associates shrimp with how large they are. "The same holds for Romance... it remains unclear in what circumstances the name was applied to the crustacean."

=== Taxonomy ===
Taxonomic studies in Europe on shrimp and prawns were shaped by the common shrimp and the common prawn, both found in huge numbers along the European coastlines. The common shrimp, Crangon crangon, was categorised in 1758 by Carl Linnaeus, and the common prawn, Palaemon serratus, was categorised in 1777 by Thomas Pennant. The common shrimp is a small burrowing species aligned with the notion of a shrimp as being something small, whereas the common prawn is much larger. The terms true shrimp or true prawn are sometimes used to mean what a particular person thinks is a shrimp or prawn. This varies with the person using the terms. But such terms are not normally used in the scientific literature, because the terms shrimp and prawn themselves lack scientific standing. Over the years the way shrimp and prawn are used has changed, and nowadays the terms are almost interchangeable. Although from time to time some biologists declare that certain common names should be confined to specific taxa, the popular use of these names seems to continue unchanged.

== Regional distinctions ==
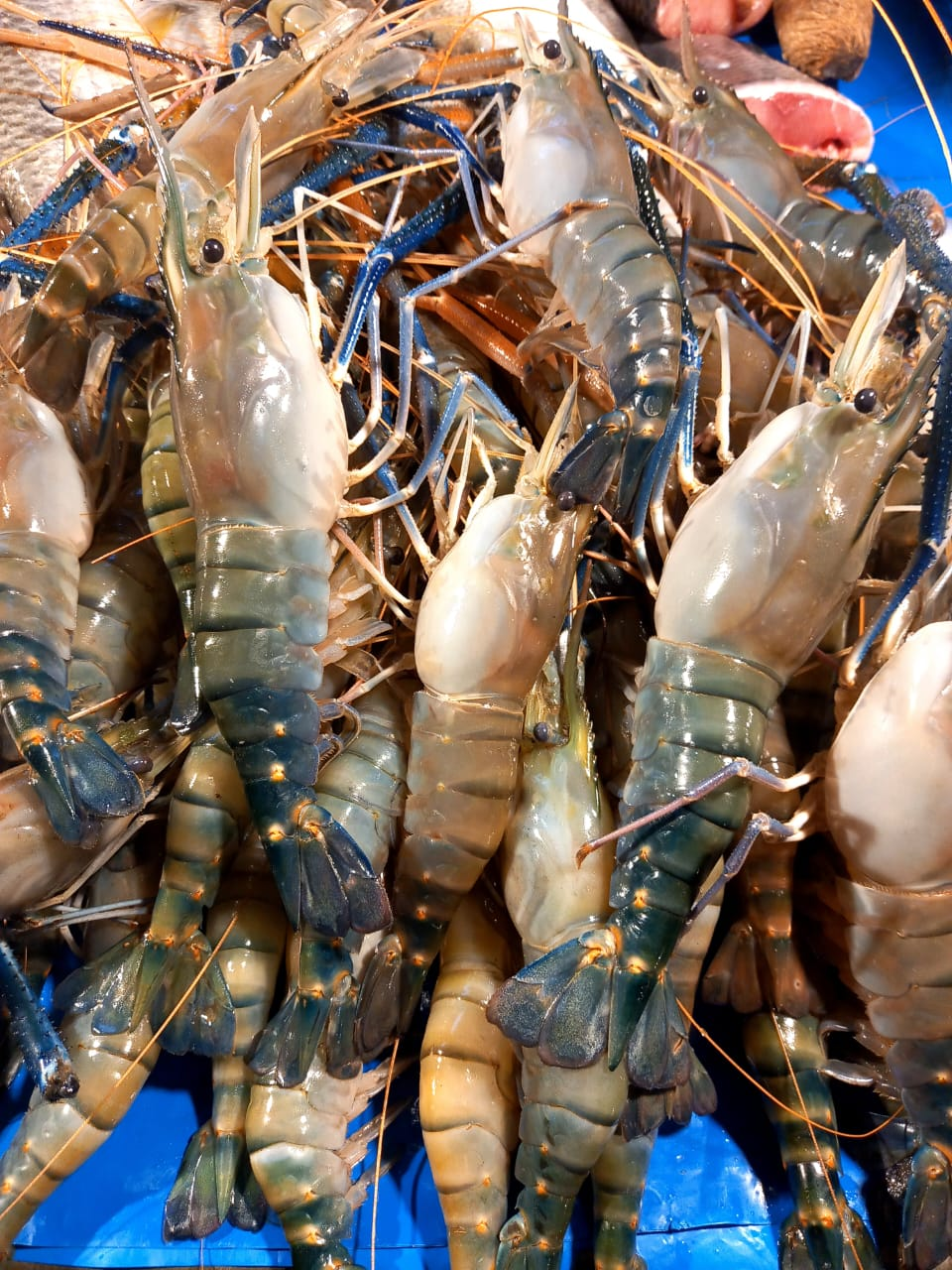
Prawns for sale in a fish market of Kolkata

The terms shrimp and prawn originated in Britain. In the use of common names for species, shrimp is applied to smaller species, particularly species that are dorsoventrally depressed (wider than deep) with a shorter rostrum. It is the only term used for species in the family Crangonidae, such as the common shrimp or brown shrimp, Crangon crangon. Prawn is never applied to very small species. It is applied to most of the larger forms, particularly species that are laterally compressed (deeper than wide) and have a long rostrum. However, the terms are not used consistently. For example, some authors refer to Pandalus montagui as an Aesop shrimp, while others refer to it as an Aesop prawn.

Commonwealth countries, and Ireland, tend to follow British usage. Some exceptions occur in Australia, where some authors refer to small species of the Palaemonidae as prawns and call the Alpheidae pistol shrimp. Other Australian authors have given the name banded coral shrimp to the prawn-like Stenopus hispidus and listed "the Processidae and Atyidae as shrimps, the Hippolytidae, Alpheidae, Pandalidae and Campylonotoidea as prawns". New Zealand broadly follows British usage. A rule of thumb given by some New Zealand authors states: "In common usage, shrimp are small, some three inches or less in length, taken for food by netting, usually from shallow water. Prawn are larger, up to 12 inches long, taken by trapping and trawling." In Canada, the terms are often used interchangeably as in New Zealand (larger species are prawns, and smaller are often shrimp), but regional variations exist. South Africa and the former British colonies in Asia also seem to follow British usage generally.

Shrimp is the more general term in the United States. The term prawn is less commonly used in the United States, being applied mainly to larger shrimp and those living in freshwater.

== See also ==
- Shrimp and prawn as food
