= H. ensifer =

H. ensifer may refer to:

- Heterocarpus ensifer, a deep-water shrimp species
- Hyposmocoma ensifer, a moth species endemic to Hawaii

== See also ==
- Ensifer (disambiguation)
