= Hallstein =

Hallstein is a given name and surname.

== Given name ==
- Hallstein Bøgseth (born 1954), Norwegian Nordic combined skier
- Hallstein Høgåsen (born 1937), Norwegian physicist
- Hallstein Rasmussen (1925–2016), Norwegian civil servant

== Surname ==
- Ingeborg Hallstein (born 1936), German coloratura soprano
- Walter Hallstein (1901–1982), German academic, diplomat and statesman

== See also ==
- Hallstein Commission, is the European Commission that held office from 7 January 1958 to 30 June 1967
- Hallstein Doctrine, was a key principle in the foreign policy of the Federal Republic of Germany (West Germany)
- Walter Hallstein Prize, German and European award
