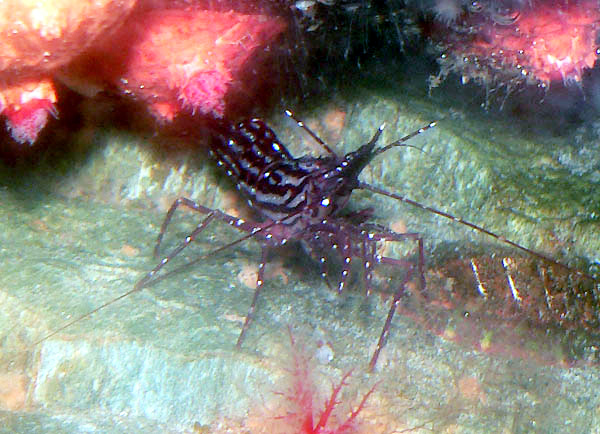

Scientific classification
- Kingdom: Animalia
- Phylum: Arthropoda
- Clade: Pancrustacea
- Class: Malacostraca
- Order: Decapoda
- Suborder: Pleocyemata
- Infraorder: Caridea
- Family: Pandalidae
- Genus: Pandalus
- Species: P. lucidirimicola

Binomial name
- Pandalus lucidirimicola (Jensen, 1998)

Synonyms
- Pandalopsis lucidirimicola Jensen, 1998

= Pandalus lucidirimicola =

Species of shrimp

Pandalus lucidirimicola, the sparkling shrimp, is a species of caridean shrimp in the family Pandalidae.

== Taxonomy ==
It was originally described in the genus Pandalopsis, which has since been synonymized with Pandalus. The species epithet, lucidirimicola, is derived from the Latin words lucid (glittering) and rimicola (crevice-dweller).

== Description ==
The species has a distinctive red or purple striping, and many reflective white or yellowish dots; their extremities are typically whitish.

== Distribution ==
The species is found along the coasts of Washington and British Columbia.

== Ecology ==
Juveniles of this species have been reported associating with the red sea urchin (Mesocentrotus franciscanus). The species is believed to be a protandric hermaphrodite.
