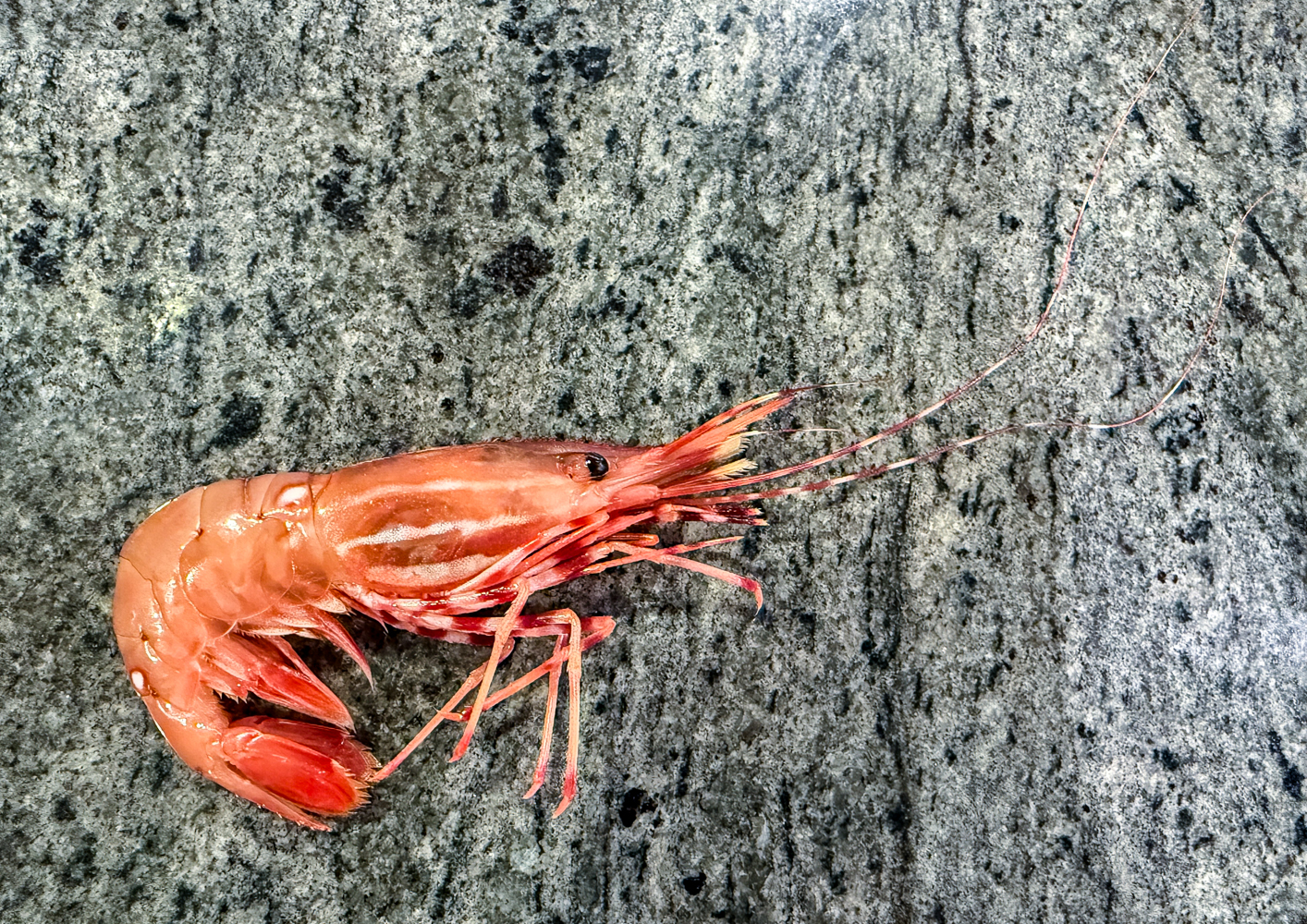

Scientific classification
- Kingdom: Animalia
- Phylum: Arthropoda
- Clade: Pancrustacea
- Class: Malacostraca
- Order: Decapoda
- Suborder: Pleocyemata
- Infraorder: Caridea
- Family: Pandalidae
- Genus: Pandalus
- Species: P. platyceros

Binomial name
- Pandalus platyceros Brandt, 1851

= Pandalus platyceros =

Species of crustacean

Pandalus platyceros, commonly known as the spot prawn or spot shrimp), is a species of true shrimp in the family Pandalidae. Spot prawns are sometimes referred to by regionally qualified names such as BC spot prawn, California spot prawn, and Alaskan prawn among others.

== Distribution ==
The spot prawn ranges throughout the northern Pacific Ocean, (Unalaska Island, Alaska to San Diego, California), and also from the Sea of Japan to Korea Strait.

While found in depths of 3.7 meters to 457.2 meters, spot prawn are most often found around 109.7 meters below sea level.

== Description ==
Spot prawn reach up to 27 centimeters in length, with females often longer than their male counterparts. Spot prawn have a translucent, reddish carapace with white stripes and pereopods and antennae which are banded dark and light red. Their first and fifth abdominal segments have white spots.

They are protandric hermaphrodites, meaning they first turn into males, with their appendix masculina lengthening while maturing and then gradually shortening until they turn into females.

== Commercial fisheries ==
Live spot prawns for sale at a T&T supermarket, in Vancouver

Spot prawn harvests are relatively short, lasting only 6-8 weeks from May to June. The season opens in the spring because it is the new lifecycle for spot prawns.

The largest spot prawn harvests occur in British Columbia, Canada where approximately 2,450 metric tonnes are harvested annually, with about 65% of the harvest coming from the waters between Vancouver Island and the BC mainland. BC spot prawns are considered sustainable having been recognized by the Vancouver Aquarium's OceanWise program and as a “Good Alternative” by the Monterey Bay Aquarium's Seafood Watch program.

The largest US harvests occur in Alaska which limits annual harvest to under 800,000 lbs (Approximately 363 tonnes). The majority of the continental US landings occur in southern California, though fishing activity extends north to the Oregon border. California produced approximately 100 metric tonnes annually.

== In cuisine ==
Spot prawns are renowned around the world for their flavour, freshness, and quality. Their meat has a sweet delicate flavour and firm texture.

They are often sold in Japan as 'Botan ebi' despite not being one of the 2 traditional domestic shrimp (Toyama ebi and Humpback Shrimp). This is because the spot prawn is a close relative of domestic Botan ebi and they can only be told apart by examining the head closely. Furthermore, one does not taste better than the other.

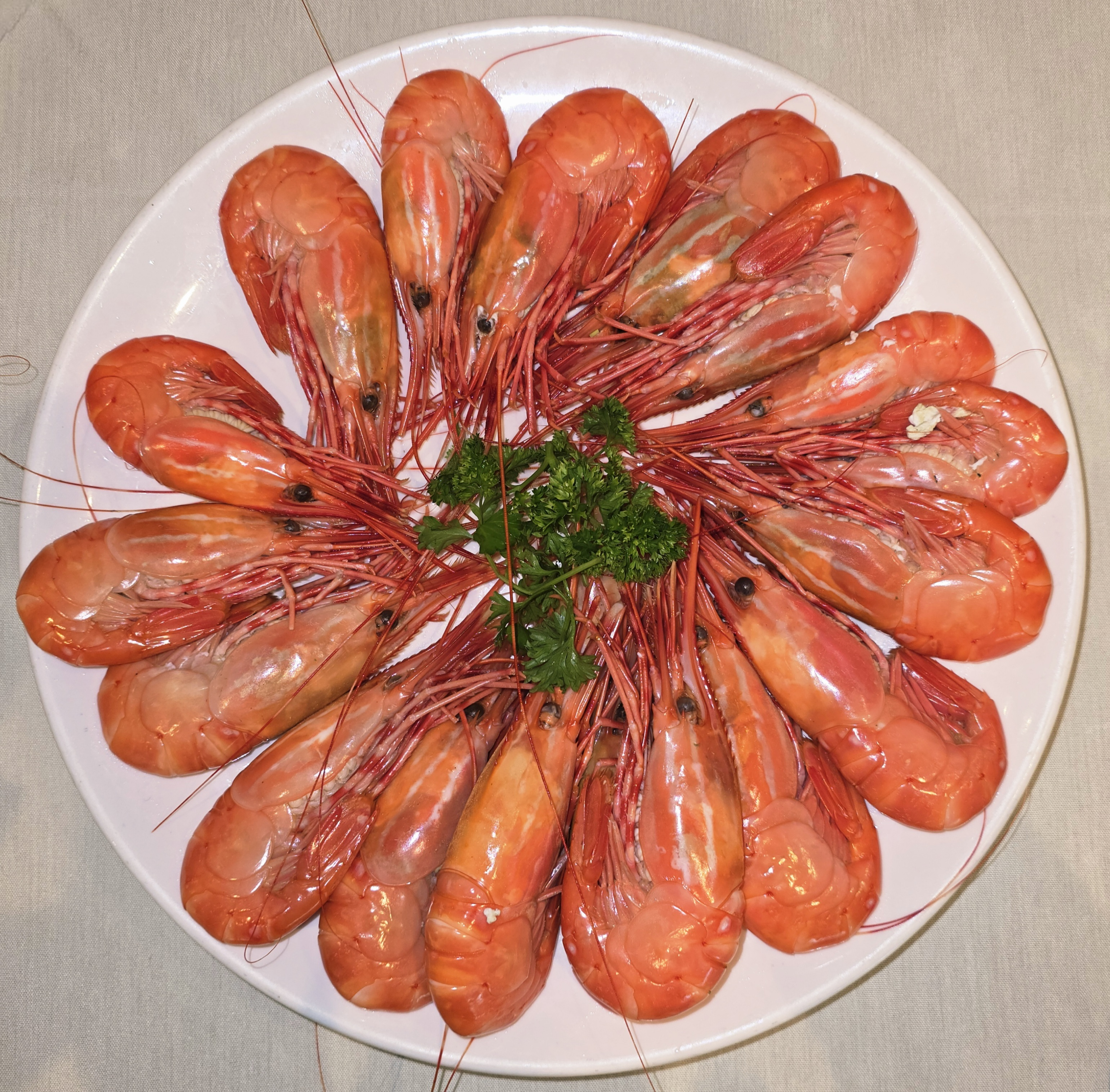
Steamed, in Vancouver, Canada

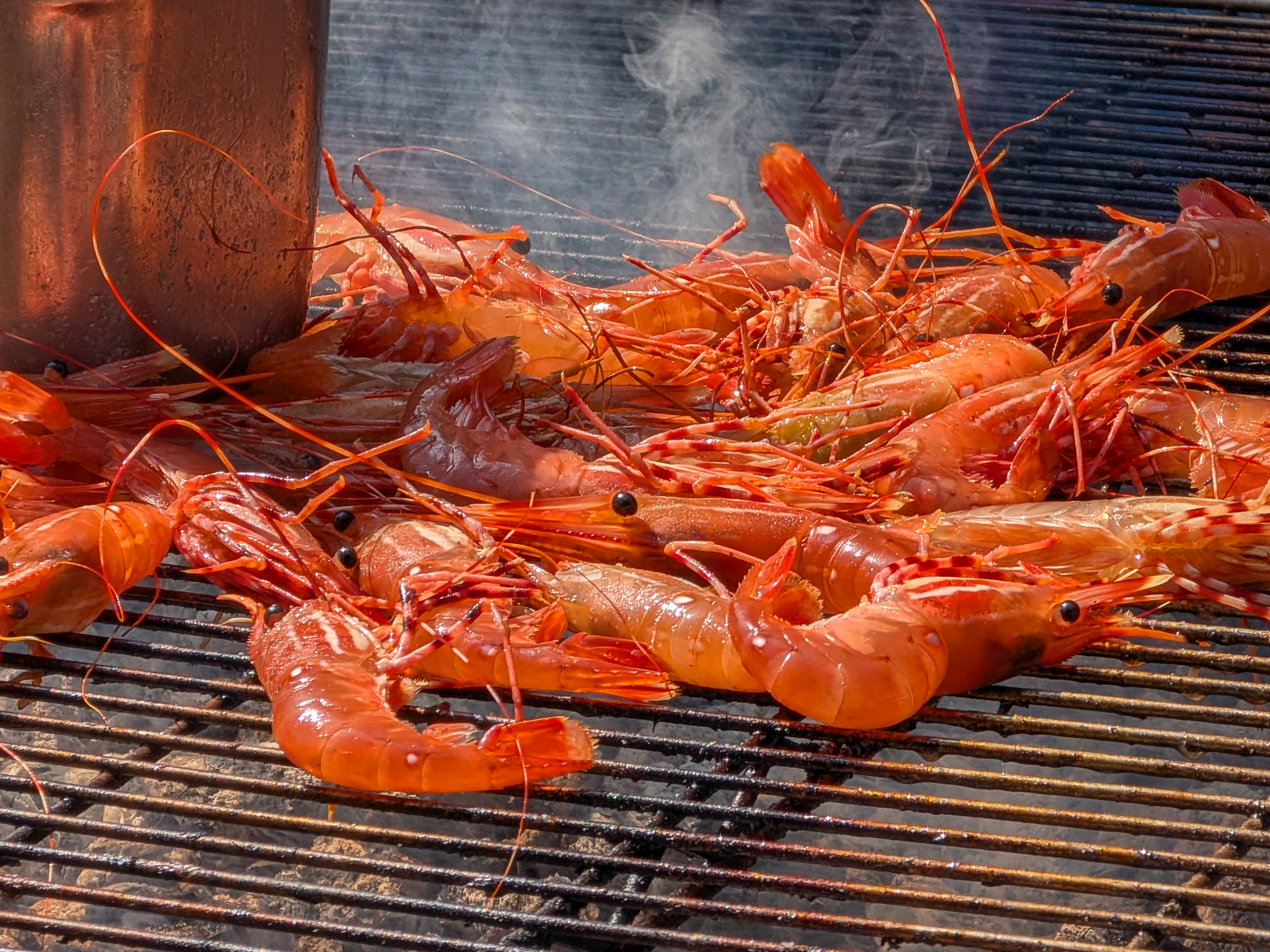
Grilled, in Victoria, Canada
