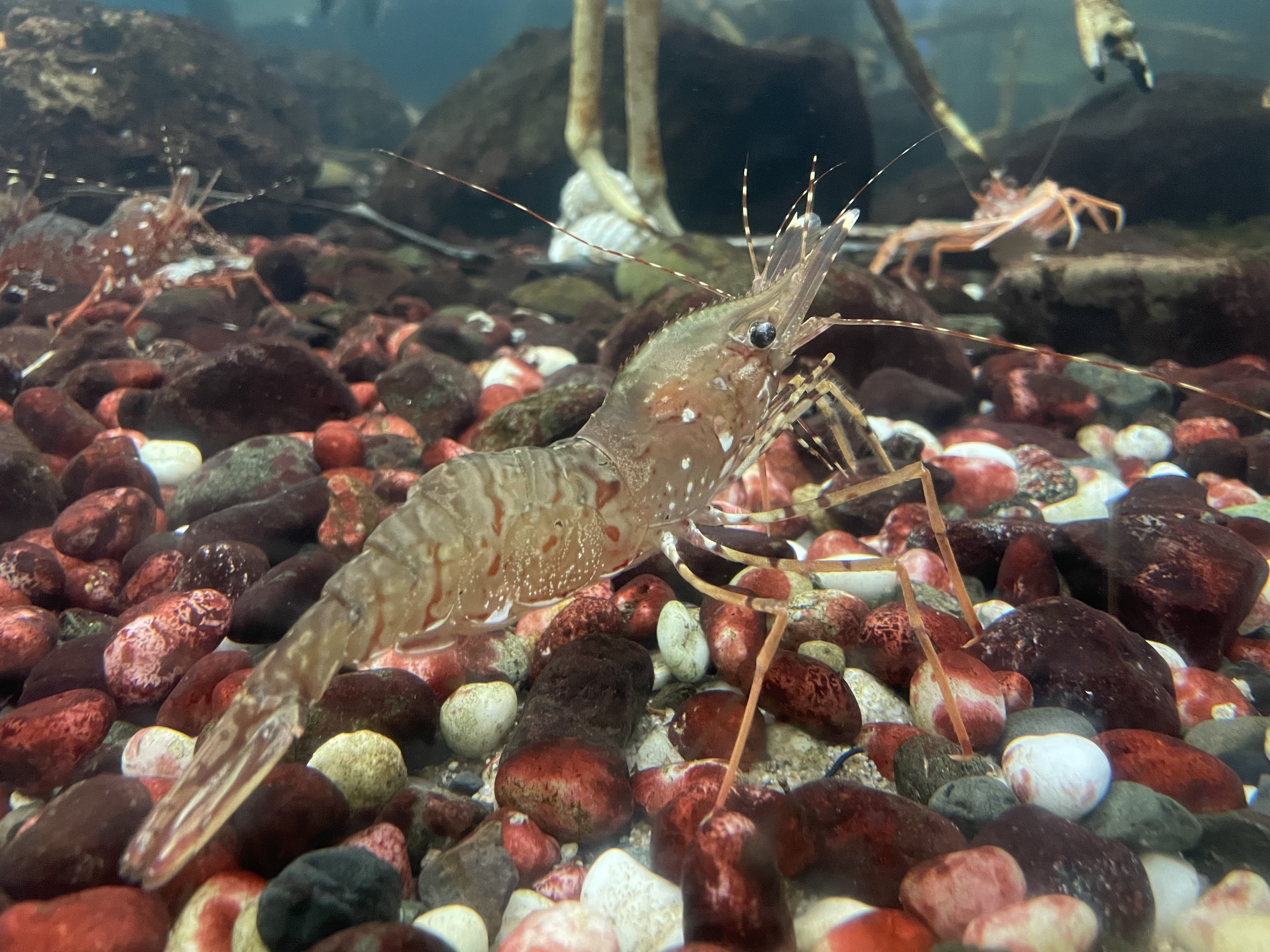
- At Sunpiazza Aquarium in Sapporo, Japan
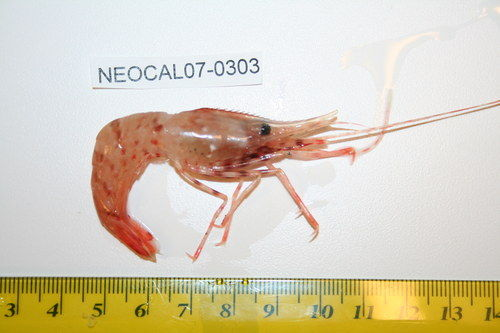

Scientific classification
- Kingdom: Animalia
- Phylum: Arthropoda
- Clade: Pancrustacea
- Class: Malacostraca
- Order: Decapoda
- Suborder: Pleocyemata
- Infraorder: Caridea
- Family: Pandalidae
- Genus: Pandalus
- Species: P. hypsinotus

Binomial name
- Pandalus hypsinotus J.F. Brandt in von Middendorf, 1851

= Pandalus hypsinotus =

Species of crustacean

Pandalus hypsinotus is a crustacean in the Pandalidae family. Called humpback shrimp in North America, there a small directed fishery in Prince Rupert. where the humpback is held to be the finest eating shrimp of all six species. In Japan, it is called Toyama shrimp (トヤマエビ), as they are found mainly in Toyama Bay.

It can be found in the Bering Sea, from the Aleutian Islands to Puget Sound, and in the Sea of Japan at depths of 100–200 metres (330–660 ft).

== Description ==
Live P. hypsinotus on sale at a T&T supermarket, in Vancouver

The species if ordinarily 10–12.5 centimetres (3.9–4.9 in) in length, but large females may reach 17.5 centimetres (6.9 in). It attains maturity as a male, and in varying proportions as a female, in the second year, and becomes a female during the third year. Subsequent survival into the fourth year is very low. Female shrimps carry eggs from November to April.
