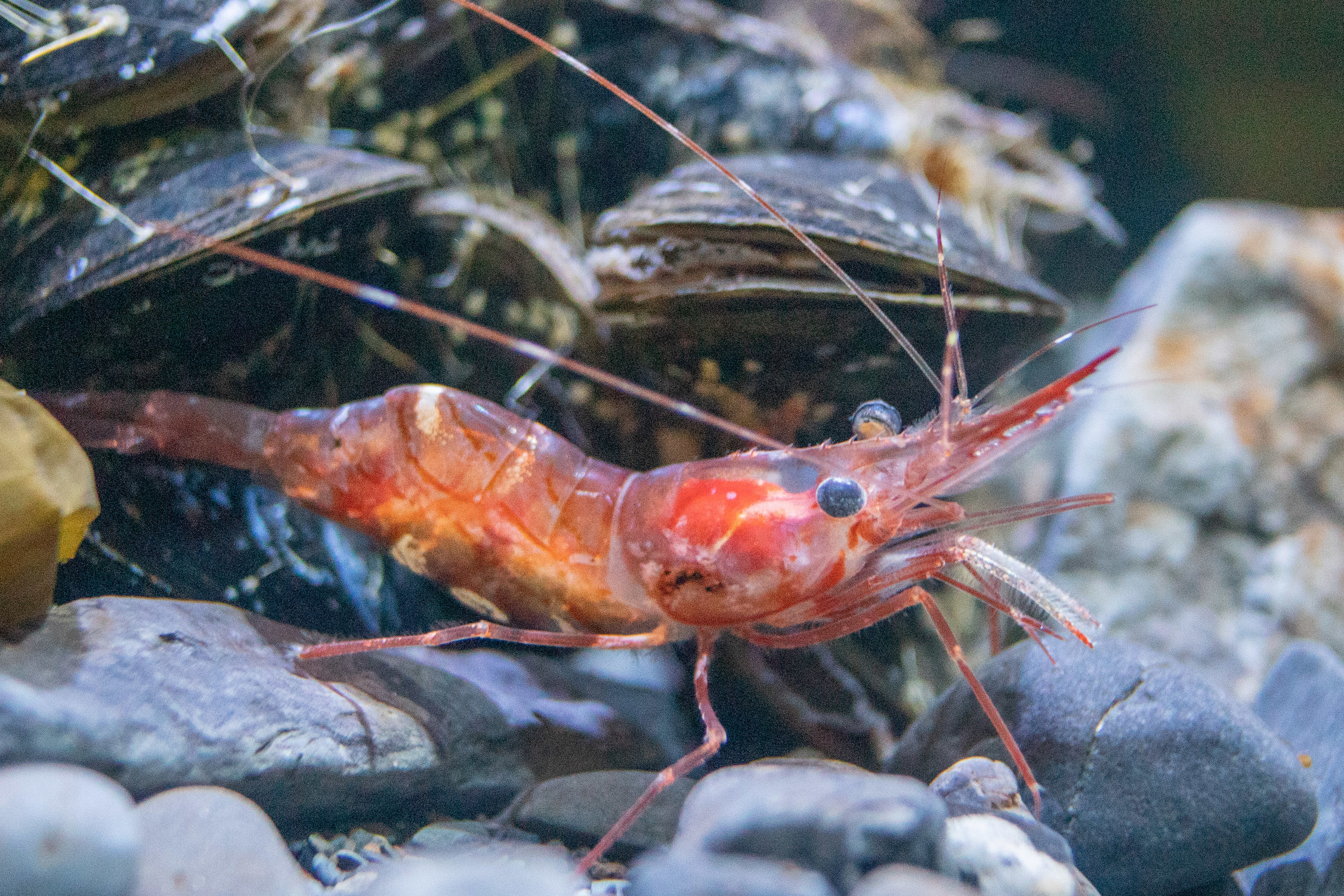

Scientific classification
- Kingdom: Animalia
- Phylum: Arthropoda
- Clade: Pancrustacea
- Class: Malacostraca
- Order: Decapoda
- Suborder: Pleocyemata
- Infraorder: Caridea
- Family: Pandalidae
- Genus: Pandalus
- Species: P. montagui

Binomial name
- Pandalus montagui Leach, 1814

= Pandalus montagui =

Species of crustacean

Pandalus montagui is a species of cold-water shrimp in the family Pandalidae. It is the type species of the genus Pandalus and is variously known as the pink shrimp, Aesop shrimp and Aesop prawn.

== Description ==
Pandalus montagui is a translucent, pinkish shrimp, generally growing to about 5 cm (2.0 in) long. Its colour is due to a number of red chromatophores and the few short red streaks running obliquely on the carapace. The rostrum is long, up-curved and divided at the tip with 10–12 teeth on its posterior dorsal edge. A spine is found under the eye on the carapace. The first antenna divides into two parts and the second is very long, exceeding the length of the body and being banded in pale and dark brown. This shrimp can be distinguished from the rather similar P. tridens by having a shorter rostrum and longer dactyls (claws) on the third and fourth pereopods (walking limbs).

== Distribution and habitat ==
Pandalus montagui has a boreo-arctic distribution. Its range extends from Greenland and Iceland, the Arctic Ocean, and the northern Atlantic Ocean, south to Rhode Island and the British Isles. It prefers hard substrates, but can be found on rock, gravel, sand, and mud. It is most common at depths between 20 and 100 m (66 and 328 ft), but sometimes occurs near low-water mark or at depths to 700 m (2,300 ft).

== Biology ==
Pandalus montagui is an omnivore, predator, and scavenger. Its diet consists mainly of small crustaceans such as copepods, hydroids, and polychaete worms. Off the Labrador coast, a large daily vertical migration was found, with the shrimp being benthic in the daytime and pelagic at night.

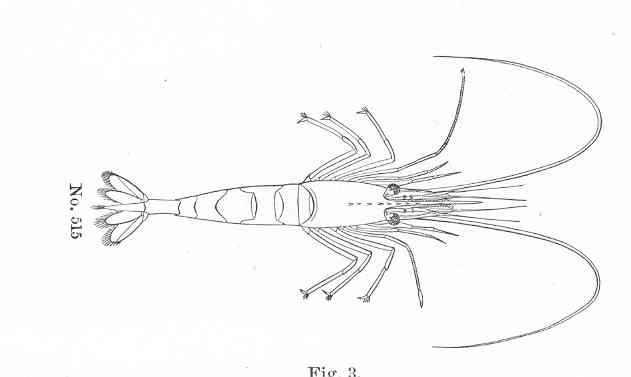
Sketch of the dorsal view of Pandalus montagui

Most individuals start life as males, but change sex to females at 12–15 months old. In the North Sea, off Britain, each female lays 2000–3000 eggs in November. When fertilised, she carries them around for a few days on her periopods. They then hatch and go through six zoeal and two to five decapod planktonic larval stages before undergoing metamorphosis and settling as juveniles. The rate of development of the larvae depends on the water temperature. In the more temperate parts of the range, the shrimp mature within a year.

== Ecology ==
In the North Sea, P. montagui is often found living in association with the polychaete worm Sabellaria spinulosa. The worm sometimes forms cold-water reefs, and these are an important source of food for the shrimp. Fishermen have used this fact by identifying the locations of reefs and then trawling for shrimp nearby.

The Aesop shrimp is sometimes found to be parasitized by the bopyrid isopod, Hemiarthrus abdominalis. This isopod also parasitizes several other species of shrimp, but has never been found on Pandalus borealis.

== Fishery ==
This species is fished commercially in the United Kingdom, but mostly taken as an alternative to the larger P. borealis. About 500 tons a year of P. montagui were caught globally in the period 2005–2007, catches also being recorded from Belgium, Denmark, the Faröe Islands, the Netherlands, Iceland, Norway, and Sweden.
