= Sigurd Asserson =

Norwegian civil servant

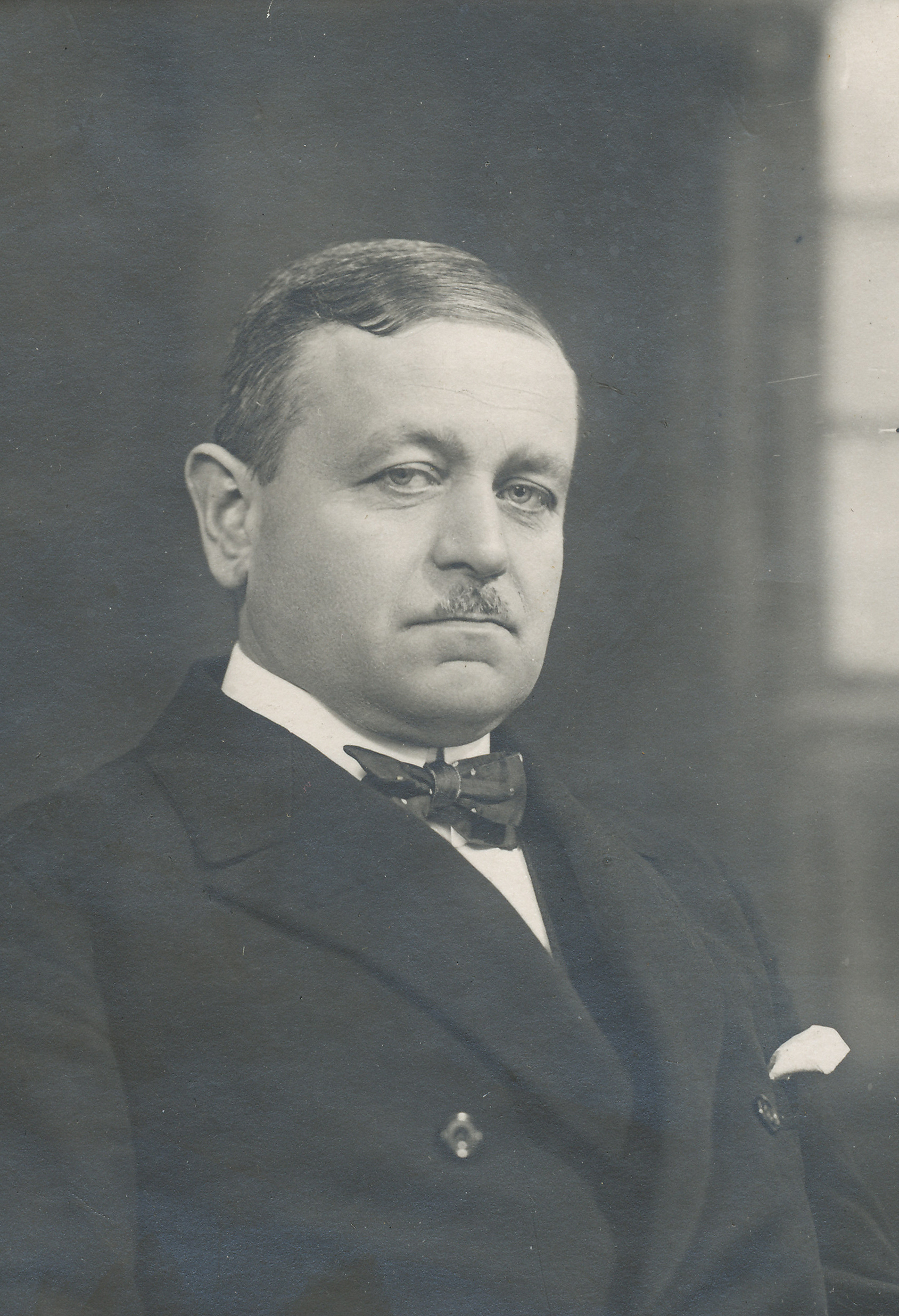
Sigurd Karsten Asserson Portrait.

Sigurd Karsten Asserson (25 June 1882 – 19 July 1937 in Oslo) was a Norwegian civil servant.

Asserson was born in Sandnes, southwestern Norway. He was the son of captain Kristian Asserson (1838–1916) and Anna Anfindsen (1850–1926).

He served as director of the Norwegian Directorate of Fisheries from 1918 to 1937. He was a Knight of the Order of Polonia Restituta (Polish), Commander of the Order of Vasa (Swedish) and Al Merito Civil (Spanish), and a Grand Officer of the Belgian Order of Leopold. He died of a heart attack in July 1937 in Oslo on his way to Copenhagen.

In 1911, he married Ingrid Haabeth (1885–1973), daughter of businessman Arne Haabeth (1849–1927) and Olava Nielsen (1864–1927).

== Works ==
- Sildefiskeriernes Historie, Bergen 1914
- Fremtidslinjen for Trondhjems ferskfiskhandel, særtrykk av Aarsberetning fra Trondhjems fiskeriselskab 1915, Trondheim 1915
- Torskefiskeriene og handelen med klippfisk og tørrfisk, særtrykk av Aarsberetning vedkommende Norges fiskerier 1928, Bergen 1928

Civic offices
Preceded by Johan Hjort	Director of the Norwegian Directorate of Fisheries; 1918–1937	Succeeded by H.J. Salvesen
