= Johan Hjort =

Norwegian marine biologist and oceanographer (1869–1948)

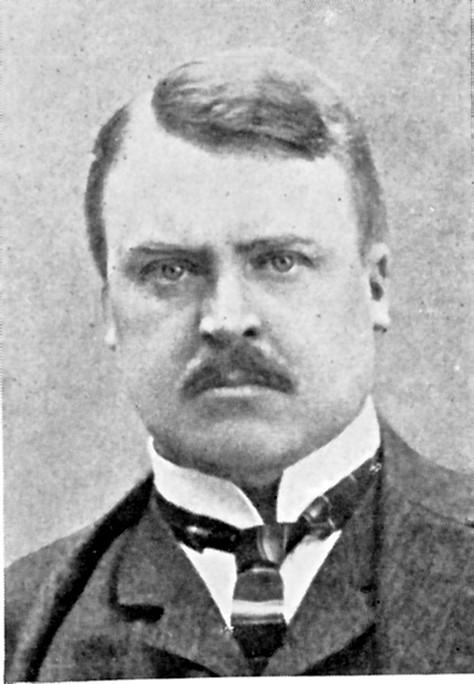
- Born: February 18, 1869; Christiania, Norway
- Died: October 7, 1948 (aged 79); Oslo, Norway
- Education: Ludwig-Maximilians-Universität München (LMU)
- Spouse: Wanda Maria von der Marwitz
- Children: 4 (including Johan Bernhard Hjort)
- Scientific career
- Fields: Marine biology, Oceanography, Fisheries science
- Thesis: Ûber den Entwicklungscyclus der zusammengesetzten Ascidien (1893)

Johan Hjort ForMemRS (18 February 1869 – 7 October 1948) was a Norwegian fisheries scientist, marine zoologist, and oceanographer. He was among the most prominent and influential marine zoologists of his time.

== The early years ==
Johan Hjort was the first child of Johan S. A. Hjort, a professor of ophthalmology, and Elisabeth Falsen, of the Falsen family. Among his siblings was the engineer Alf Hjort, who became a leader of subwater tunnel constructions in New York City. Johan Hjort had wanted to become a zoologist since his early schooldays, but to please his father he took initial courses in medicine, before following Fridtjof Nansen's advice and his own wish, leaving for the Ludwig-Maximilians-Universität München to study zoology with Richard Hertwig. He then worked at the Stazione Zoologica in Naples on an embryological problem, which led to his doctorate in Munich at the age of 23 in 1892. He returned to Norway to become curator of the University Zoological Museum, where he developed more modern courses for students, and in 1894 he succeeded G. O. Sars as Research Fellow in Fisheries. After a year at University of Jena he was in 1897 appointed the directorship of the University Biological Station in Drøbak.

== International career ==
Hjort became the director at the Norwegian Institute of Marine Research in Bergen, from 1900 to 1916. His early influences abroad kept him involved in international research work, and he was among the founding fathers of International Council for the Exploration of the Sea (ICES) in 1902. He was the Norwegian delegate at ICES from 1902 to 1938, when he was elected President, a position he held to his death in 1948.

In 1909, Sir John Murray wrote to the Norwegian government that if they would lend the Michael Sars vessel to him for a four-month research cruise, under Hjort's scientific command, then Murray would pay all expenses. After a winter of preparation, this resulted in what was by that time the most ambitious oceanographic research cruise ever. The 1912 Murray and Hjort book The Depths of the Ocean quickly became a classic for marine naturalists and oceanographers.

For several years, Hjort had been interested in the statistical nature and causes of the large fluctuations of fish populations. He was the first to apply actuarial statistical methods to study these phenomena, aided also by measurement techniques that made it possible to estimate the age of sampled fish. Hjort's studies culminated in the 1914 article Fluctuations in the Great Fisheries of Northern Europe, which was a pivotal work in the development of fisheries science.

These studies made him interested in population dynamics more generally, the challenge of understanding the growth of populations of different organisms, ranging from cultures of yeast at one extreme to man, whales and fish at the other. He considered implications of such studies important also for human society, influenced in such views by Malthus, Darwin and others. He was early on concerned with effects of over-fishing, with the declining whale populations in the Antarctic an early warning, and worked on methods for determining the optimum catch that would secure sustainable populations.

Hjort was a versatile individual who could also apply his broadly based theoretical knowledge in strikingly practical ways. In 1924 he invented novel industrial mechanical machinery for extraction of whale oil from blubber. He is also credited with being the "practical inventor of shrimp fishery", on both sides of the Atlantic. The shrimp, in particular the deep-water shrimp Pandalus borealis, were known species, but were considered rare and not worth looking for. Around 1898, Hjort adapted earlier designs of deep-sea trawls on the soft bottoms of the deep Norwegian fjords and soon discovered enormous stocks of Pandalus borealis. This at first did not impress the fishermen. As H. G. Maurice, the 1920–1938 President of ICES, recalls, "Hjort wasted no time in argument. He went prawn fishing, returned to harbour with a spectacular catch and dumped it on the quay. That was enough. With that practical demonstration he laid the foundation of an exceedingly profitable fishery and a flourishing export trade". Many years later, when travelling to Harvard in 1936 to collect an honorary degree, he predicted that the deep-sea shrimp would be found off the New England coast, since the ecological conditions were similar to those of the soft-bottomed Norwegian fjords. Taking time off to pursue his hypotheses, he was given command of the research ship Atlantis, and found vast amounts of shrimp exactly where he predicted they would be; this led to the formation of a shrimp fishery industry on the US side.

During the First World War, Hjort became engaged to some extent in politics and specifically foreign relations with both Germany and Britain. Hjort was asked to take part in negotiations between Norway and England to reach agreement on fish-purchase, and he did so, on the assumption that the agreement would be made public. Norway's foreign minister Nils Claus Ihlen, who was afraid of German reprisals, demanded however that it should be kept secret. In protest, Hjort resigned, both from the negotiations and also as Director of Fisheries, and left Norway for some years. After spending time in Denmark and at the University of Cambridge, he was given a professorship in Oslo from 1921.

Hjort was a frequent contributor to public debate, and wrote books, essays and newspaper articles on themes ranging from popularisation (and unification) of science to politics and philosophy.

For his achievements in science and in practical oceanographic and fisheries research Hjort was awarded several honours, including honorary degrees from the universities of Cambridge, Harvard and London. He was an elected fellow of a number of foreign scientific societies, including the Royal Society and the American Philosophical Society. He was given the first ever Agassiz Medal, and received the Orders of St Olav, of Nordstjernen, and of Dannebrog.

Sir Alister Hardy writes the following about Hjort: "He was one of the great leaders in oceanography whose names will live in the annals of that science [...] His fame will last both for the contributions he made to oceanic biology, especially in that classic The Depths of the Ocean which he published with Sir John Murray as a result of their North Atlantic expedition in 1910, and equally for his remarkable pioneer achievements in practical fisheries research. All in a position to judge [...] regard him as the most outstanding personality in the ICES since its foundation in 1902; from that date until his death he remained the Norwegian delegate and became its President in 1938."

In his book about Norwegian scientists, Francis Bull gave the following description of Hjort: "As a superior, he was without peer; helpful, kind, patient – as an equal, rather difficult, because he always believed he was right – and as a subordinate, sure of himself and full of the desire to oppose."

Hjort had four children with Wanda Maria von der Marwitz (1868–1952), whom he met while a student in München in 1893. His eldest son was the supreme court lawyer Johan Bernhard Hjort (1895–1969).

== Selected publications ==
- 1892: Zum Entwicklungscyklus der zusammengesetzen Ascidien. Zool. Anz. 15, 218–332.
- 1912 (with Sir John Murray): The Depths of the Ocean. Reprinted 1965 as Tomus xxxvii in the Historiae Naturalis Classica series.
- 1914: Fluctuations in the Great Fisheries of Northern Europe. Rapports, Conceil Permanent International pour l'Exploration de la Mer.
- 1921: The Unity of Science. Gyldendal, London.
- 1927: Utenrikspolitiske oplevelser under verdenskrigen (Foreign policy experiences during the world war). Gyldendal Norsk Forlag.
- 1931: The Emperor's New Clothes. Confessions of a Biologist. (Also published in Norwegian and in German.)
- 1933 (with G. Jahn and P. Ottestad): The Optimum Catch. Hvalrådets skrifter, 7, 92–127.
- 1935: Human Activities and the Study of Life in the Sea: An Essay on Methods of Research and Experiment. The Geographical Review (American Geographical Society).
- 1937: The story of whaling. A parable of sociology. Sci. Mon., London, 45, 19–34.
- 1938: The Human Value of Biology. Harvard University Press, Cambridge, Massachusetts.
- 1940: Tilbake til arbeidet (Back to work). Gyldendal Norsk Forlag.
- 1945: Krigen. Det store folkebedrag. Essays om dens problemer (The War: The Great Deception. Essays on its Problems).
- 1948: The renaissance of the individual. Journal of the International Council for the Exploration of the Sea, 15, 157–168.

The standard author abbreviation "J.Hjort" is used to indicate Johan Hjort as the author when citing a botanical name.

== Named after Hjort ==
- The research vessel Johan Hjort. Three vessels have borne Hjort's name; the first was built in 1922, the second in 1932, and the third in 1990.
- Idioteuthis hjorti, a whip-lash squid
- Balaenanemertes hjorti, a ribbon worm
- Echinoclathria hjorti, a sponge
- Prionoglossa hjortii, a pelagic mollusc
- Saccopharynx hjorti, a gulper eel
- Hjort Massif, a mountain range in Antarctica
- Hjort Trench
- Hjort maturity scale
- Johan Hjorts vei ("Johan Hjort Street") in Bergen

== See also ==
- Age class structure
- International Whaling Commission
- List of people on stamps of Norway

Civic offices
Preceded by Gabriel Westergaard; Jens O. Dahl	Director of the Norwegian Directorate of Fisheries; 1906–1918	Succeeded by Sigurd Asserson
