= Alf Hjort =

Norwegian engineer

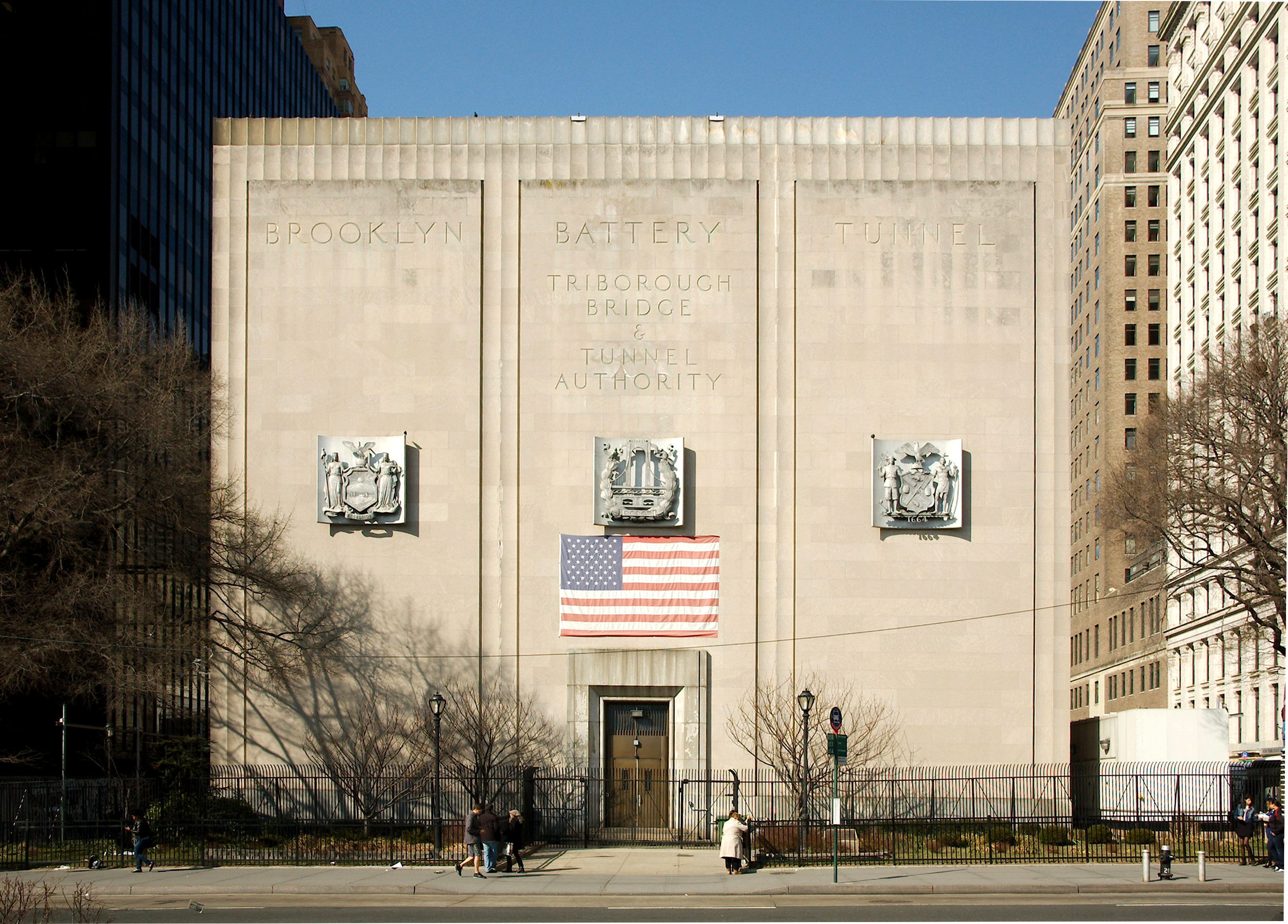
Brooklyn Battery Tunnel Portal Building

Alf Hjort (12 October 1877 – 12 December 1944) was a Norwegian-born American electrical engineer. He played a leading part in the planning and construction of the underground and underwater railroad and car tunnels of New York City, as well as the extensions of the city's metropolitan subway system.

== Background ==
Alf Hjort was born in Christiania (now Oslo), Norway. He was a younger brother of Norwegian oceanographer and marine zoologist Johan Hjort. Their parents were Johan S.A. Hjort (1835–1905), a professor of ophthalmology, and Elisabeth Falsen (1849–1922) of the Falsen family. After graduating from Oslo Gymnasium, he went to Hannover, Germany, to study mechanical and electrical engineering. After work periods in Berlin and London, Hjort came to the United States in 1904.

== Career ==
From 1904 to 1909 he served as chief engineer of Pearson & Sons, one of the largest and best known contracting and construction firms at the time. Hjort's task was to oversee the planning and construction of the Pennsylvania Railroads Tunnels under the Hudson River, and the Long Island Rail Road Tunnels under the East River. This was one of the greatest engineering and construction enterprises ever undertaken anywhere in the world up to that time.

After the completion of these projects, Hjort was engaged with the Degnon Contracting Company of New York City, in the task of building part of the Catskill Water Supply Project, which was used to supply New York City with water. In 1911, Hjort went to Flinn-O'Rourke Construction Company and served as this firm's chief engineer from 1929 until his death in New York during 1944. Under his watch a string of New York City Subway tunnel projects were planned and completed, most notably the Brooklyn–Battery Tunnel between the southern tip of Manhattan and Brooklyn.

In 1911, Hjort was among the founders of The American-Scandinavian Foundation in New York City. He also maintained close links to his native Norway during his 40 years in the United States.

== Primary sources ==
- Bjork, Kenneth Saga In Steel And Concrete - Norwegian Engineers In America (Northfield, Minnesota: Norwegian-American Historical Association. 1947)
- Pfeiffer, Henry Prominent Men of New York: Individual Biographic Studies with Character Portraits. Volume 1 (New York City: Historical Records, Inc. 1940)
