= Knut Vartdal =

Norwegian politician

Knut Vartdal (born 1 October 1940) is a Norwegian politician from the Centre Party.

He was appointed State Secretary in the Ministry of Fisheries in 1968 when the cabinet Borten held office. He lost this job when the cabinet fell in 1971, but returned from 1972 to 1973, during the cabinet Korvald. He served as a deputy representative in the Norwegian Parliament from Møre og Romsdal during the term 1973–1977.

From 1973 to 1978, he led the Norwegian Directorate of Fisheries.

Civic offices
| Preceded by Klaus Sunnanå | Director of the Norwegian Directorate of Fisheries; 1973–1978 | Succeeded by Hallstein Rasmussen |
