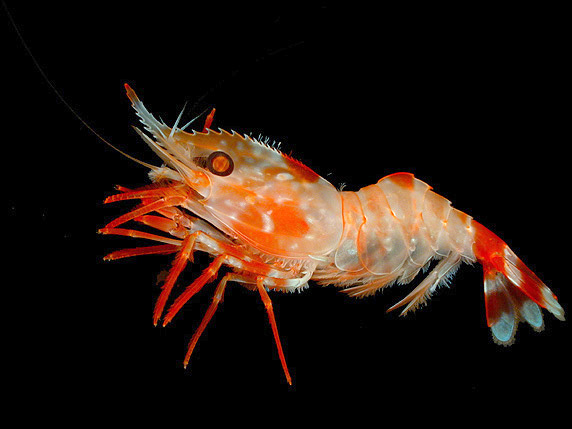

Scientific classification
- Kingdom: Animalia
- Phylum: Arthropoda
- Clade: Pancrustacea
- Class: Malacostraca
- Order: Decapoda
- Suborder: Pleocyemata
- Infraorder: Caridea
- Family: Pandalidae
- Genus: Heterocarpus
- Species: H. ensifer

Binomial name
- Heterocarpus ensifer A. Milne-Edwards, 1881

= Heterocarpus ensifer =

Species of crustacean

Heterocarpus ensifer is a species of deep-water shrimp. The nominate subspecies is found in the Atlantic Ocean from Spain and Madeira to Angola and from North Carolina to the Gulf of Mexico and Caribbean Sea; other subspecies occur in the Pacific Ocean and around the Philippines and Indonesia. Despite being one of the most abundant shrimp in some areas, its biology is still poorly known. These deep water crustaceans are most copious between 300 and 400m. Their distribution demonstrates an ability to adapt well to distinct environments. It is generally found at depths of 200–885 m (656–2,904 ft).

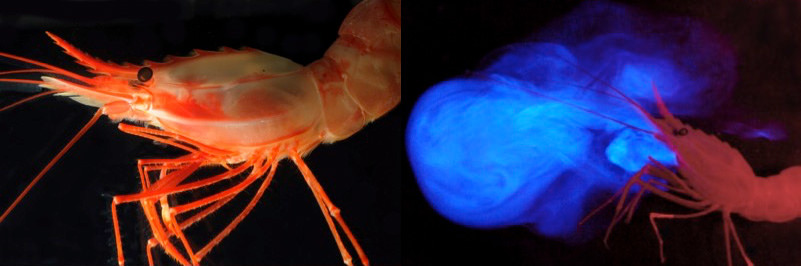
Heterocarpus ensifer close-up and after "vomiting" or "spitting" bioluminescent fluid.
