= Norwegian Institute of Marine Research =

National consultative research institute for marine research

Coordinates: 60°23′59.86″N 5°18′14.01″E

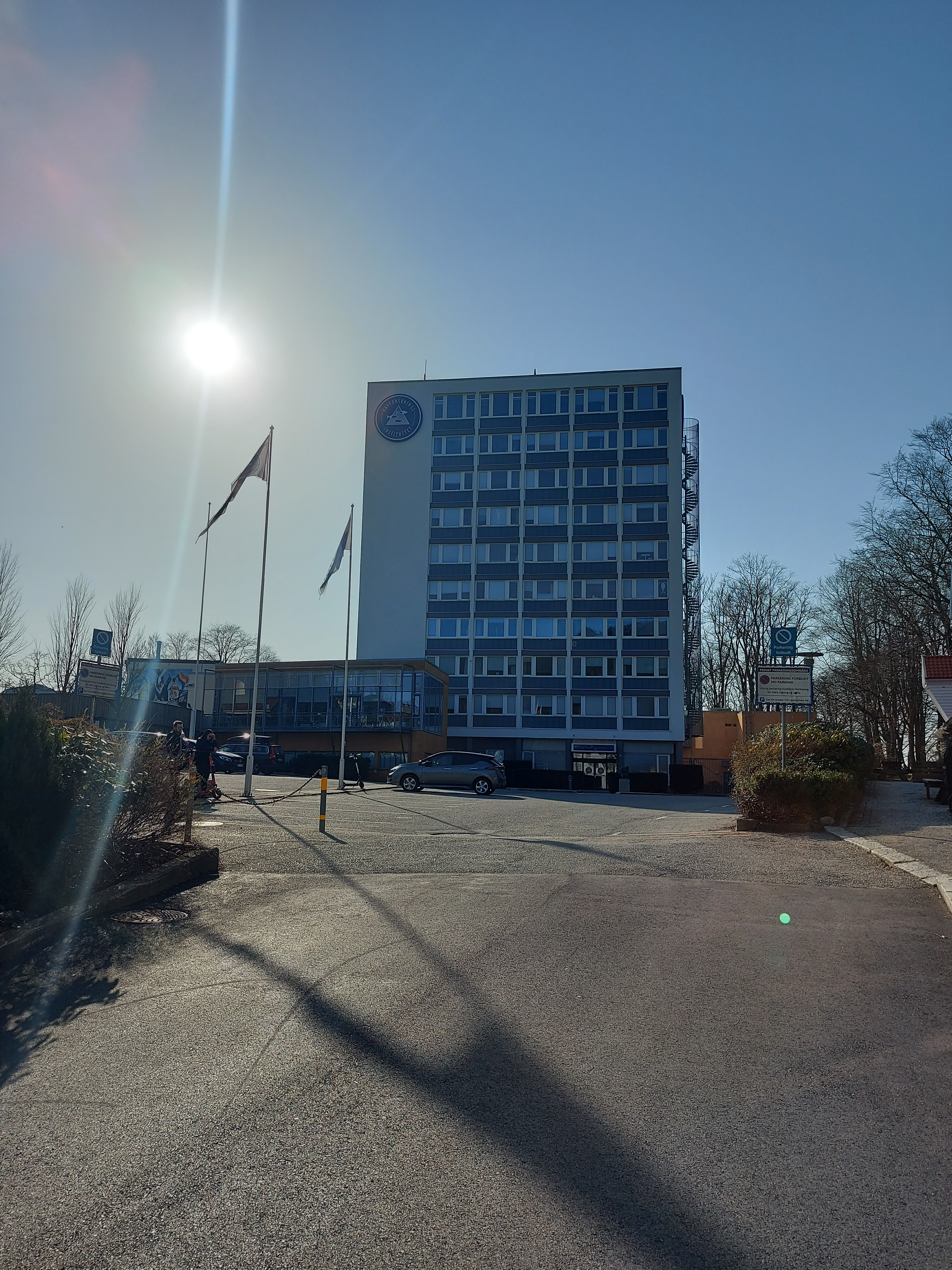
- Staff: ~1000
- Owner: Ministry of Fisheries and Coastal Affairs (Norway)
- Location: Bergen, Norway
- Website: www.hi.no/en

The Norwegian Institute of Marine Research (Norwegian: Havforskningsinstituttet) is a national consultative research institute which is owned by the Ministry of Fisheries and Coastal Affairs. The institute performs research and provides advisory services in the fields of marine ecosystems and aquaculture.

With a staff of almost 1100, the Institute of Marine Research is the largest centre of marine research in Norway, and among the largest in Europe. The institute has a highly qualified scientific staff, high-technology research stations and laboratories in Austevoll, Bergen (head office), Flødevigen (Arendal) and Matre, a department in Tromsø and several vessels.

The primary responsibility of the Institute of Marine Research is to provide advice to national authorities, society and industry regarding questions related to the ecosystems of the Barents Sea, the Norwegian Sea, the North Sea and the Norwegian coastal zone and in the field of aquaculture. The institute is heavily engaged in development aid activities through its Centre for Development Cooperation in Fisheries.

Norwegian Fisheries Investigations ("Norske Fiskeriundersøgelser") was initiated in Oslo in 1864. In 1900 the investigations was located to Bergen, and in 1947, the institute was separated as a research institute under the Norwegian Directorate of Fisheries. To further ensure its independence, the institute became an independent institution in 1989.

Among important scientific contributions was Johan Hjort's pivotal work on «Fluctuations in the Great Fisheries of Northern Europe» (1914). Einar Lea's use of ASDIC to find herring schools (1947) and the use of Echo Integration for estimating fish abundance (Midtun & Hoff, 1962) are also notable.
