= Hallstein Rasmussen =

Norwegian civil servant (1925–2016)

- Born: 22 April 1925; Fræna Municipality, Norway
- Died: 28 February 2016 (aged 90); Bergen Municipality, Norway
- Education: University of Oslo
- Occupation: Civil servant
- Awards: Order of St. Olav (1995)

Hallstein Rasmussen (22 April 1925 – 28 February 2016) was a Norwegian civil servant.

Rasmussen was born in Fræna Municipality, and graduated from the University of Oslo in 1952. He was first hired at the Norwegian Directorate of Fisheries in 1953, where he worked as secretary for the director Klaus Sunnanå. From 1958 to 1968 he served as secretary general for the trade union Norges Fiskarlag. From 1968 he was assigned assisting director in the Norwegian Directorate of Fisheries, and was appointed head of the Norwegian Directorate of Fisheries from 1978 to 1988. He was decorated Knight, First Class of the Order of St. Olav in 1995

Civic offices
Preceded by Knut Vartdal	Director of the Norwegian Directorate of Fisheries; 1978–1988	Succeeded by Viggo Jan Olsen
