= Liv Holmefjord =

Norwegian economist and civil servant (born 1962)

- Born: 1962 (age 63–64)
- Education: Economist
- Alma mater: Norwegian School of Economics
- Occupation: Civil servant

Liv Holmefjord (born 1962) is a Norwegian economist and civil servant. She graduated as economist from the Norwegian School of Economics, and has worked for the Statens Fiskarbank and Statens nærings- og distriktsutviklingsfond. She was appointed head of the Norwegian Directorate of Fisheries from 2008, succeeding Peter Gullestad.

Civic offices
Preceded by Peter Gullestad	Director of the Norwegian Directorate of Fisheries; 2008–2020	Succeeded by Per Sandberg (acting)
