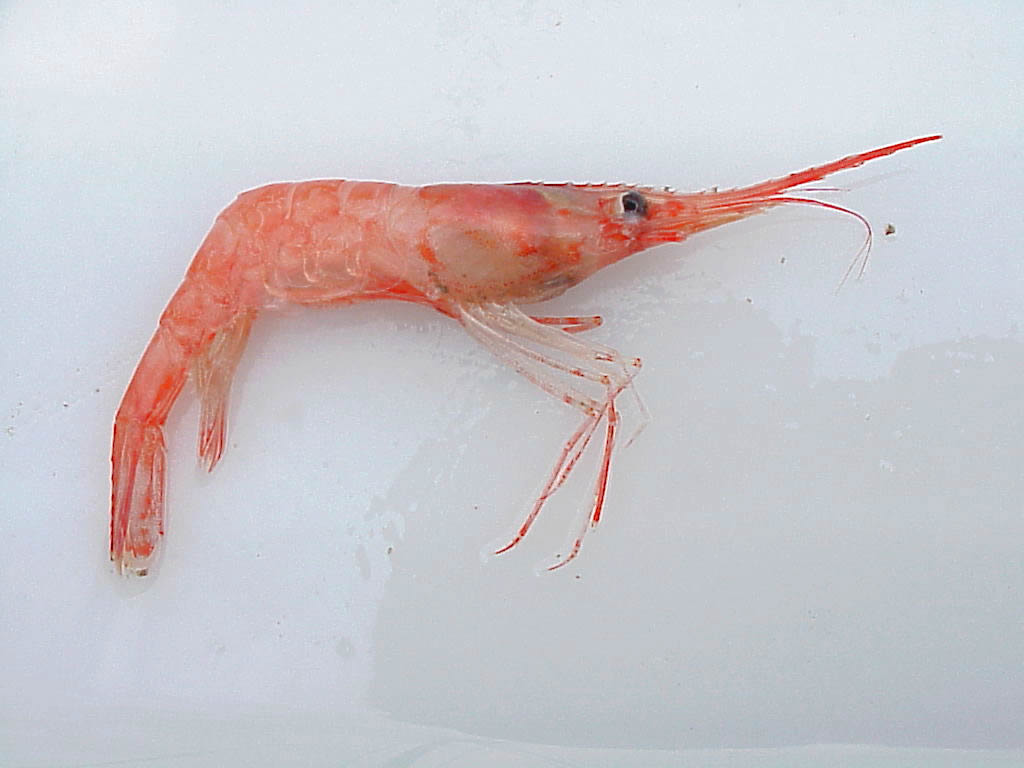
- Pandalus borealis

Scientific classification
- Kingdom: Animalia
- Phylum: Arthropoda
- Clade: Pancrustacea
- Class: Malacostraca
- Order: Decapoda
- Suborder: Pleocyemata
- Infraorder: Caridea
- Family: Pandalidae
- Genus: Pandalus; Leach, 1814

Type species
- Pandalus montagui Leach, 1814

= Pandalus =

Genus of crustaceans

Pandalus (cold-water prawn) is a genus of shrimp in the family Pandalidae. Members of the genus are medium-sized and live on or near the seabed. Some species are the subject of commercial fisheries and are caught by trawling. One species, Pandalus montagui, lives in association with the reef-building polychaete worm, Sabellaria spinulosa.

Their lifespan is typically three to five years, with sexual maturity being reached at an early age. Members of this genus are protandric hermaphrodites, starting life as males and later becoming females. Reproduction takes place in the spring when up to 3,000 eggs are produced and fertilised internally. The female carries them around under the abdomen for about six days before they develop into planktotrophic larvae. These remain in the plankton for four to six months. During this time, they drift with the currents and have a dispersal potential of at least 10 km (6.2 mi) The shrimp have a rapid growth rate, so populations can build up quite rapidly after disturbance or habitat destruction.

== Species ==
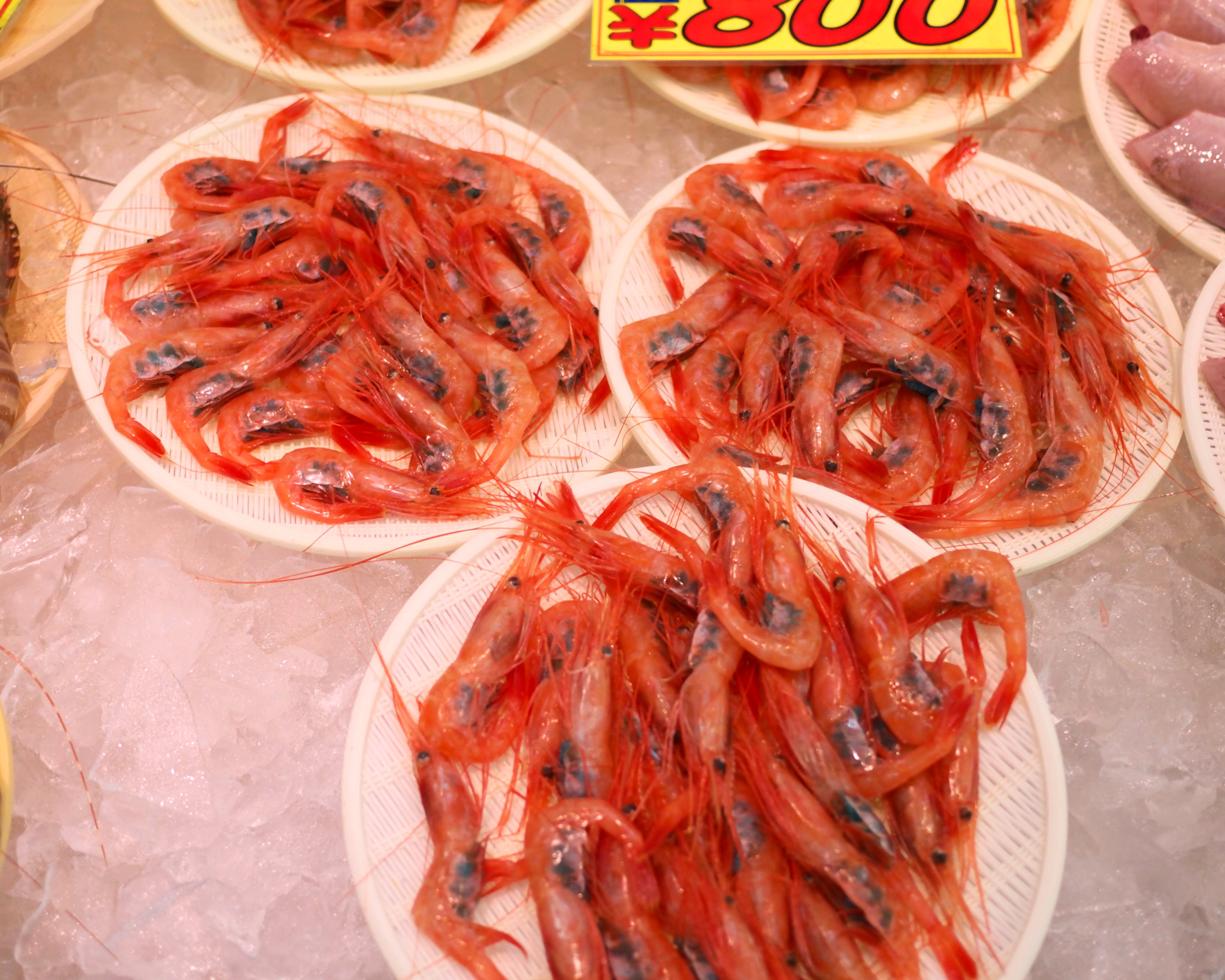
Pandalus eous (amaebi) in Teradomari, Niigata, Japan

The following extant species are accepted by the World Register of Marine Species:

- Pandalus aleuticus (Rathbun, 1902)
- Pandalus amplus (Spence Bate, 1888)
- Pandalus borealis Krøyer, 1838
- Pandalus capillus (Komai & Hibino, 2019)
- Pandalus chani Komai, 1999
- Pandalus coccinatus (Urita, 1941)
- Pandalus curvatus Komai, 1999
- Pandalus danae Stimpson, 1857
- Pandalus dispar (Rathbun, 1902)
- Pandalus eous Makarov, 1935
- Pandalus formosanus Komai, 1999
- Pandalus gibbus (Komai & Takeda, 2002)
- Pandalus glabrus (Kobjakova, 1936)
- Pandalus goniurus Stimpson, 1860
- Pandalus gracilis Stimpson, 1860
- Pandalus gurneyi Stimpson, 1871
- Pandalus houyuu (Komai & Hibino, 2019)
- Pandalus hypsinotus J.F. Brandt in von Middendorf, 1851
- Pandalus ivanovi Komai & Eletskaya, 2008
- Pandalus japonicus (Balss, 1914)
- Pandalus jordani Rathbun, 1902
- Pandalus lamelligerus J.F. Brandt in von Middendorf, 1851
- Pandalus latirostris Rathbun, 1902
- Pandalus longipes (Komai, 1994)
- Pandalus longirostris (Rathbun, 1902)
- Pandalus lucidirimicolus (Jensen, 1998)
- Pandalus miyakei (Hayashi in Baba, Hayashi & Toriyama, 1986)
- Pandalus montagui Leach, 1814
- Pandalus multidentatus (Kobjakova, 1936)
- Pandalus nipponensis Yokoya, 1933
- Pandalus ochotensis (Kobjakova, 1936)
- Pandalus pacificus Doflein, 1902
- Pandalus platyceros J.F. Brandt in von Middendorf, 1851
- Pandalus prensor Stimpson, 1860
- Pandalus princeps (Komai & Hibino, 2019)
- Pandalus profundus (Zarenkov, 1971)
- Pandalus punctatus (Kobjakova, 1936)
- Pandalus rubrus (Komai, 1994)
- Pandalus spinosior (Hanamura, Khono & Sakaji, 2000)
- Pandalus stenolepis Rathbun, 1902
- Pandalus teraoi Kubo, 1937
- Pandalus tridens Rathbun, 1902
- Pandalus zarenkovi (Ivanov & Sokolov, 2001)

One additional species is known from the fossil record.

== Commercial fisheries ==
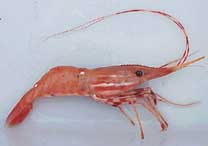
Pandalus platyceros

These species are caught commercially:

- Northern shrimp or prawn – Pandalus borealis
- Pink (smooth or ocean) shrimp – Pandalus jordani
- Flexed or humpy shrimp – Pandalus goniurus
- Dock shrimp – Pandalus danae
- Humpback shrimp – Pandalus hypsinotus
- Pink shrimp – Pandalus montagui
- Spot shrimp – Pandalus platyceros

== See also ==
- Krill
