= Claudio Magris =

Italian scholar, translator and writer (born 1939)

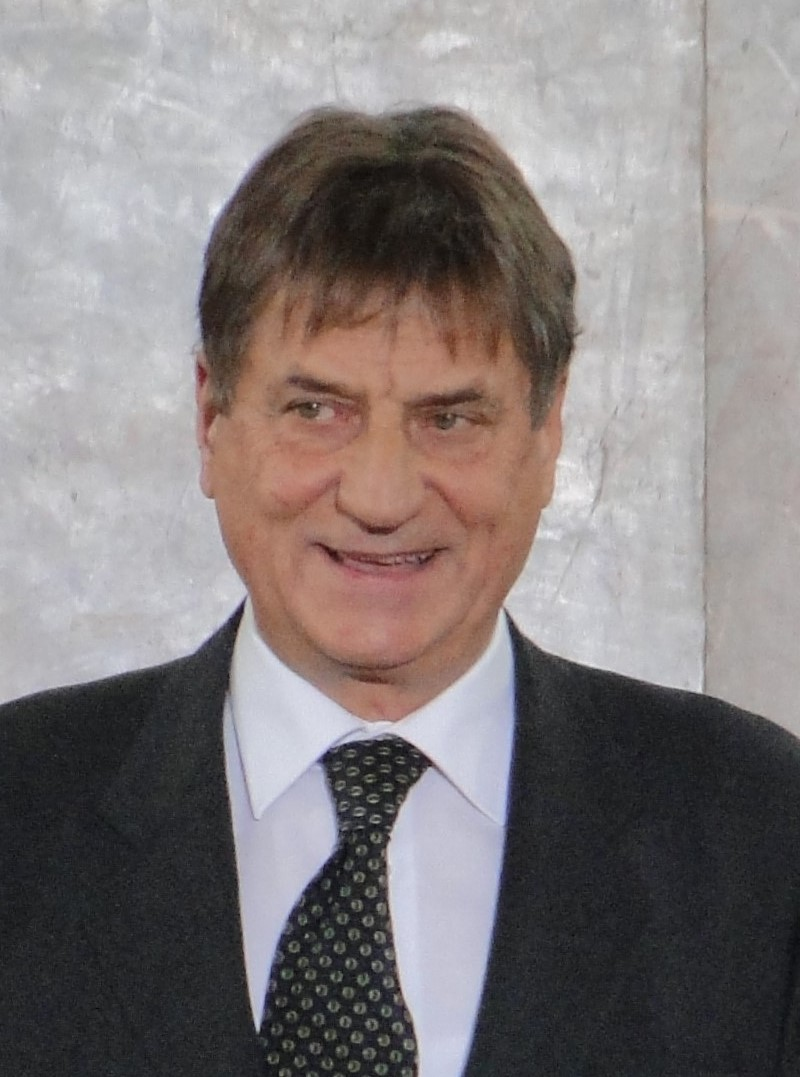
- Claudio Magris in 2009
- Born: 10 April 1939 (age 87); Trieste, Italy
- Education: University of Turin
- Occupations: Scholar, translator and writer
- Writing career
- Period: 1963–present
- Notable works: Danubio; Microcosmi

Member of the Senate of the Republic
- In office 15 April 1994 – 8 May 1996
- Constituency: Trieste

Personal details
- Party: Independent

Claudio Magris (Italian: [ˈklaudjo ˈmaɡris]; born 10 April 1939) is an Italian scholar, translator and writer. He was a senator for Friuli-Venezia Giulia from 1994 to 1996.

== Life ==
Magris graduated from the University of Turin, where he studied German studies, and has been a professor of modern German literature at the University of Trieste since 1978.

He is an essayist and columnist for the Italian newspaper Corriere della Sera and for other European journals and newspapers. His numerous studies have helped to promote an awareness in Italy of Central European culture and of the literature of the Habsburg myth, a concept which he coined in 1963.

Magris is a member of several European academies and served as a senator in the Italian Senate from 1994 to 1996.

His first book on the Habsburg myth in modern Austrian literature rediscovered central European literature. His journalistic writings have been collected in Dietro le parole ("Behind Words", 1978) and Itaca e oltre ("Ithaca and Beyond", 1982). He has written essays on E.T.A. Hoffmann, Henrik Ibsen, Italo Svevo, Robert Musil, Hermann Hesse and Jorge Luis Borges. His novels and theatre productions, many translated into several languages, include Illazioni su una sciabola (1984), Danubio (1986), Stadelmann (1988), Un altro mare (1991), and Microcosmi (1997). His travel writing is collected in Journeying (Yale University Press, 2018).

His breakthrough was Danubio (published as Danube in English) (1986), which is a magnum opus. In this book (said by the author to be a "drowned novel"), Magris tracks the course of the Danube from its sources to the sea, tracing the influences of Christendom and Islam on the formation of central Europe. Microcosmi (Microcosms in English) focuses on the Italian-Istrian borderlands.

== Decorations and awards ==
- 1980: Austrian Cross of Honour for Science and Art, 1st class
- 1987: Bagutta Prize for Danubio
- 1990: French Award for Best Foreign Book (essays) for Danubio
- 1992: Humboldt Research Award from the Alexander von Humboldt Foundation
- 1994: Gold Medal of Honour of the City of Vienna
- 1997: Strega Prize for Microcosmi
- 2000: Würth Prize for European Literature
- 2001: Knight Grand Cross of the Order of Merit of the Italian Republic
- 2001: Erasmus Prize
- 2001: Leipzig Book Prize for European Understanding (Grand Prize)
- 2001: Member of the Academy of Arts Berlin
- 2004: Prince of Asturias Award for Literature
- 2006: Austrian State Prize for European Literature
- 2008: Walter Hallstein Prize
- 2009: Friedenspreis des Deutschen Buchhandels
- 2009: Prix Européen de l'Essai Charles Veillon
- 2009: Prix Jean Monnet European Literature
- 2009: Vilenica Prize – Slovenian international literature prize for Central European authors
- 2009: Knight of the Order of Arts and Letters of Spain
- 2012: Austrian Decoration for Science and Art
- 2012: Cross of the Order of Merit of the Federal Republic of Germany
- 2014: FIL Literary Award in Romance Languages
- 2015: Pour le Mérite
- 2015: Knight Commander's Cross of the Order of Merit of the Federal Republic of Germany
- 2016: Franz Kafka Prize
- 2019: Thomas Mann Prize

=== Honorary doctorates ===
- 1991: University of Strasbourg
- 1993: University of Copenhagen
- 1995: University of Klagenfurt
- 1999: University of Szeged
- 2011: Katholieke Universiteit Leuven (Belgium)
- 2011: University of Barcelona
- 2014: University of Murcia
- 2014: West University of Timisoara
- 2017: Free University of Berlin
- 2018: University of Regensburg

=== Memberships ===
- 2001: Academy of the Arts, Berlin, Section Literatur
- Deutsche Akademie für Sprache und Dichtung, Darmstadt
- Bayerische Akademie der Schönen Künste, Munich
- Akademie der Wissenschaften und der Literatur, Mainz
- Österreichische Akademie der Wissenschaften, Wien
- Accademia delle scienze di Turino
- Akademie der Wissenschaften, Göttingen

== Works ==
- Lontano da dove: Joseph Roth e la tradizione ebraico-orientale (1971; "Far from Where: Joseph Roth and the Oriental Hebrew Tradition")
- Itaca e oltre (1982; "Ithaca and Beyond")
- L’anello di Clarisse: grande stile e nichilismo nella letteratura moderna (1984; "Clarisse’s Ring: Tradition and Nihilism in the Modern Literature")
- Illazioni su una sciabola (1984; translated as Inferences from a Sabre, ISBN 0-7486-6036-4)
- Danubio (1986; translated as Danube: A Sentimental Journey from the Source to the Black Sea, ISBN 0-00-272074-4)
- Stadelmann (1988)
- Un altro mare (1991; translated as A Different Sea, ISBN 0-00-271339-X)
- Microcosmi (1997; translated as Microcosms, ISBN 1-86046-618-4).
- Alla cieca (2006; translated as Blindly, ISBN 978-0-670-06856-2)
- Non luogo a procedere (2015; translated as Blameless, ISBN 978-88-11-68917-1)
- Tempo curvo a Krems (2019) ISBN 978-88-11-60825-7, German translation 2022

== See also ==
- Simon Winder
