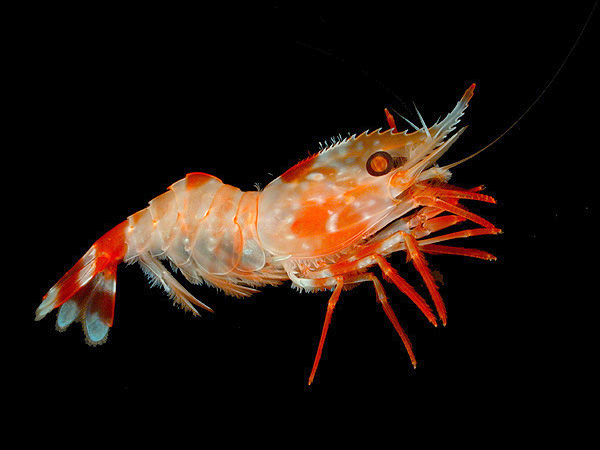
- Heterocarpus ensifer

Scientific classification
- Domain: Eukaryota
- Kingdom: Animalia
- Phylum: Arthropoda
- Class: Malacostraca
- Order: Decapoda
- Suborder: Pleocyemata
- Infraorder: Caridea
- Family: Pandalidae
- Genus: Heterocarpus; A. Milne-Edwards, 1881

Type species
- Heterocarpus ensifer A. Milne-Edwards, 1881

= Heterocarpus =

Genus of crustaceans

Heterocarpus is a genus of deep-sea shrimp, mainly of tropical areas all over the world.

== Description ==
Heterocarpus is characterised by the highly unequal second pair of pereiopods: one side is long and thin and the other is short but stronger, besides the carapace with one or more longitudinal carinae.

== Species ==
So far, 30 species have been described for this genus, Heterocarpus ensifer being the type species. The described species of this genus are:

- Heterocarpus abulbus Yang, Chan & Chu, 2010
- Heterocarpus affins Faxon, 1893
- Heterocarpus alexandri A. Milne-Edwards, 1883
- Heterocarpus amacula Crosnier, 1988
- Heterocarpus calmani Crosnier, 1988
- Heterocarpus chani Li, 2006
- Heterocarpus corona Yang, Chan & Chu, 2010
- Heterocarpus cutressi Monterossa, 1988
- Heterocarpus dorsalis Bate, 1888
- Heterocarpus ensifer A. Milne-Edwards, 1881
- Heterocarpus inopinatus Tavares, 1999
- Heterocarpus intermedius Crosnier, 1999
- Heterocarpus gibbosus Bate, 1888
- Heterocarpus grimaldii A. Milne-Edwards & Bouvier, 1900
- Heterocarpus hayashii Crosnier, 1988
- Heterocarpus hostilis Faxon, 1893
- Heterocarpus laevigatus Bate, 1888
- Heterocarpus lepidus De Man, 1917
- Heterocarpus longirostris McGilchrist, 1905
- Heterocarpus neisi Burukovsky, 1986
- Heterocarpus oryx A. Milne-Edwards, 1881
- Heterocarpus parvispina Crosnier, 1988
- Heterocarpus reedi Bahamondi, 1955
- Heterocarpus sibogae De Man, 1917
- Heterocarpus signatus Rathbun, 1906
- Heterocarpus tenuidentatus Crosnier, 2006
- Heterocarpus tricarinatus Alcock & Anderson, 1894
- Heterocarpus unicarinatus Borradeile, 1915
- Heterocarpus woodmasoni Alcock, 1901
- Heterocarpus vicarius Faxon, 1893

== Ecology ==
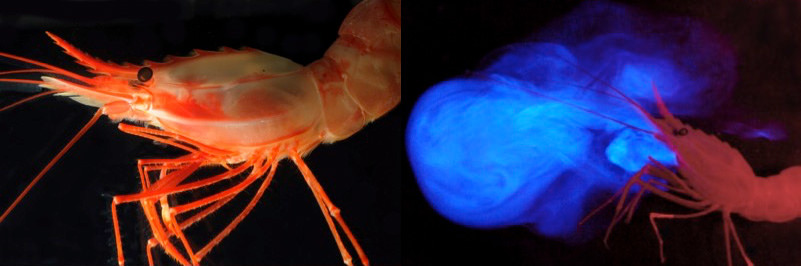
Heterocarpus ensifer close-up and after "vomiting" or "spitting" bioluminescent fluid.

Many Heterocarpus shrimp are known for using bioluminescence as a defense, spitting it on predators. Studies about their feeding habits, and the fact that they may be found in the stomach contents of some pelagic sharks and other fishes is interpreted as they have benthic habits, but they do migrations to the water column at night. Some species of this genus have high fishery potential, such as H. reedi and H. laevigatus.
