= Norwegian Directorate of Fisheries =

Norwegian government agency presiding over civilian marine matters

- Fiskeridirektoratet

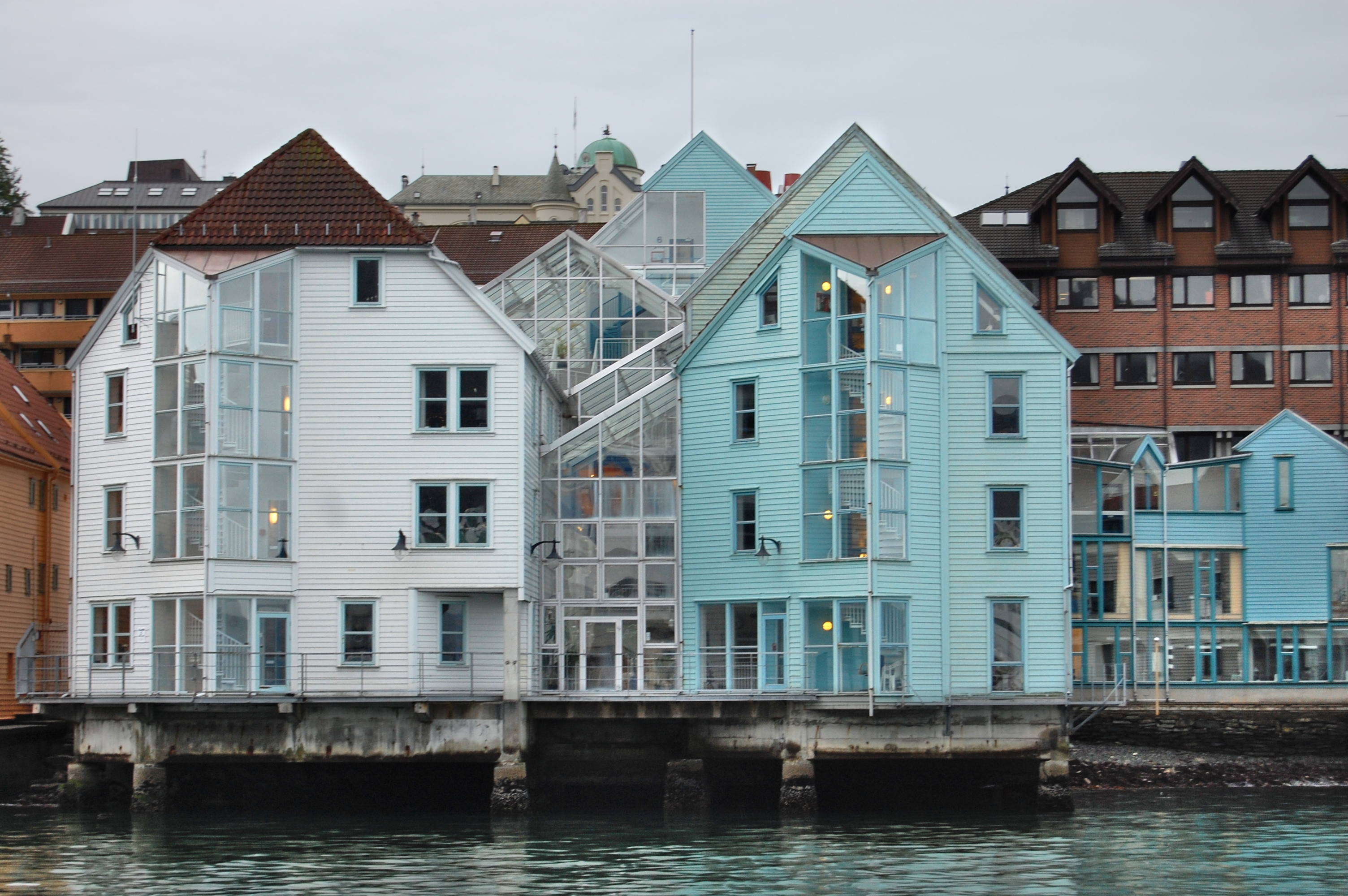
- Headquarters in Bergen

Government agency overview
- Formed: 1900
- Headquarters: Bergen, Norway
- Government agency executive: Frank Bakke-Jensen, Director
- Parent Government agency: Ministry of Trade, Industry and Fisheries
- Website: fiskeridir.no/fiskeridir/english

The Norwegian Directorate of Fisheries (Norwegian: Fiskeridirektoratet) is a Norwegian government agency formerly under the Ministry of Fisheries and Coastal Affairs. On 1 January 2014, it was incorporated into the new Ministry of Trade, Industry and Fisheries.

Established in 1900, it is responsible for advising and executing the ministry's policy. It formerly conducted research, but the Institute of Marine Research was split out in 1989. The organization consists of a headquarters in Bergen, seven regional offices and more than twenty local offices spread around the country.

== Heads of the Directorate ==
- Gabriel Westergaard and Jens O. Dahl (1900–1906)
- Johan Hjort (1906–1918)
- Sigurd Asserson (1918–1937)
- H. J. Salvesen (1938–1945)
- Ola Brynjelsen (1945–1948)
- Klaus Sunnanå (1948–1973)
- Knut Vartdal (1973–1978)
- Hallstein Rasmussen (1978–1988)
- Viggo Jan Olsen (1988–1996) and Peter Gullestad (1996–2008)
- Liv Holmefjord (2008–2020)
- Frank Bakke-Jensen (2021–present)
