= Jōganji River =

Jōganji River 常願寺川
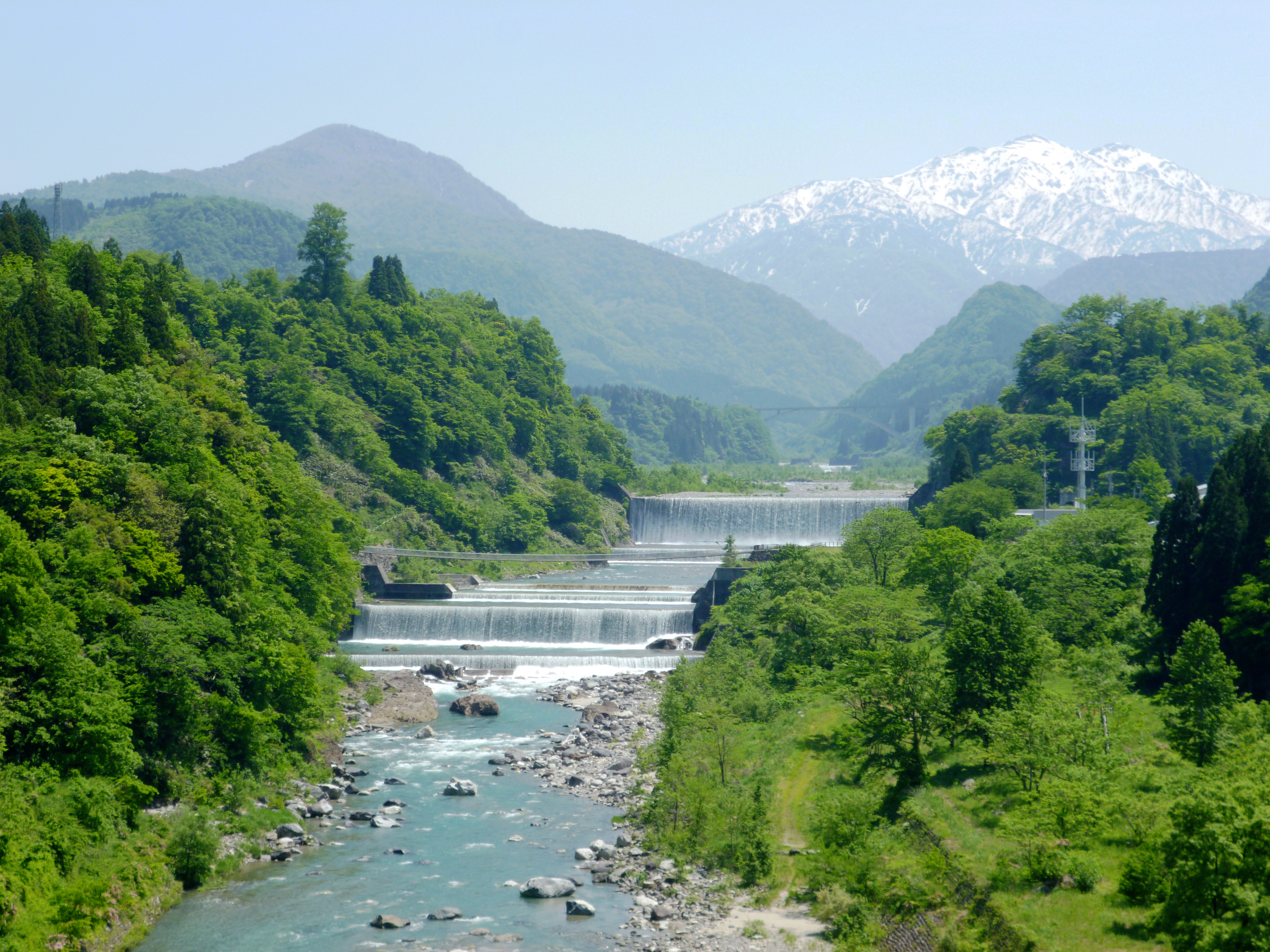
- The Jōganji River flowing through the city of Toyama

Location
- Country: Japan

Physical characteristics
- Source
  - location: Mount Kitanomata
  - elevation: 2,661 m (8,730 ft)
- Mouth
  - location: Toyama Bay
- Length: 56 km (35 mi)
- Basin size: 368 km^{2} (142 sq mi)
- Discharge
  - average: 15 m^{3}/s (530 cu ft/s)

Basin features
- River system: Jōganji River

The Jōganji River (常願寺川, Jōganji-gawa) is a Class A river in Toyama Prefecture, Japan, that flows through the city of Toyama as well as the town of Tateyama. The river was previously referred to as the Nii River (新川 Nii-kawa).

== Route ==
The river originates in the Tateyama Mountains in the south-eastern area of the city of Toyama. From there, it flows north-west, helping form the border between Toyama and Tateyama. It then cuts through Toyama before emptying into Toyama Bay.

== Geographic ==
=== Tributary ===
- Shomyo River
- Wada River
- Oguti River

Toyama Prefecture
Tateyama, Toyama

== See also ==
- Tateyama Sabō Erosion Control Works Service Train
