= Toyama Bay =

Bay in Toyama, Japan

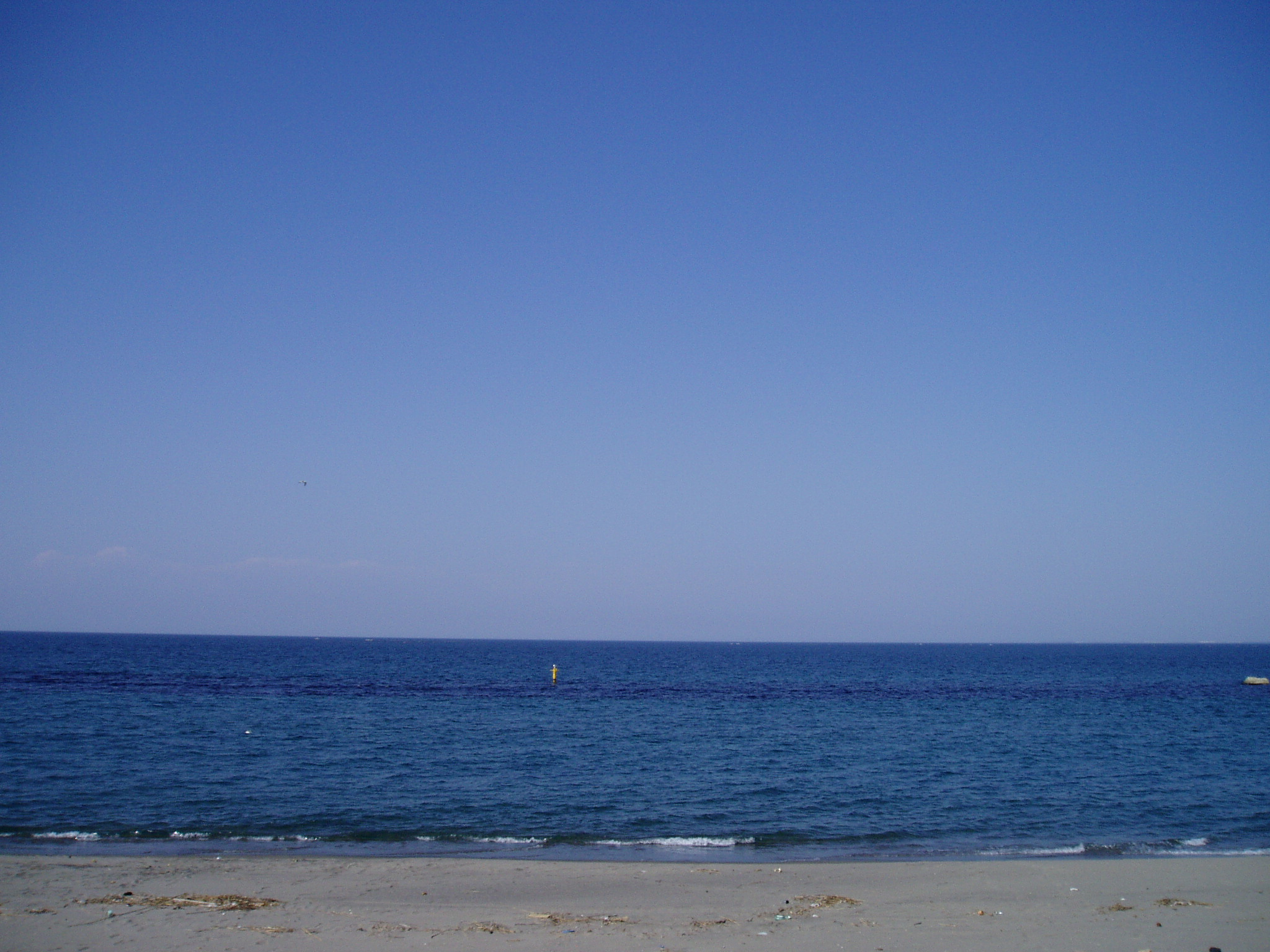
- Toyama Bay from a beach in Toyama

- Location within Japan
- Coordinates: 36°50′N 137°10′E
- River sources: Kurobe, Jōganji, Jinzū, Shō
- Ocean/sea sources: Sea of Japan
- Basin countries: Japan
- Max. depth: more than 1,200 m (3,937 ft)
- Settlements: Kurobe, Uozu, Namerikawa, Toyama, Imizu, Takaoka, Himi, Nanao

Toyama Bay (富山湾, Toyama-wan) is a bay located on the northern shores of the Hokuriku region of Honshu, Japan on the Sea of Japan. The bay borders Toyama and Ishikawa prefectures. The bay is known for the mirages on the horizon during the winter months and for being a spawning ground for the firefly squid. It is also one of Japan's three largest bays. Parts of the bay are within the borders of the Noto Hantō Quasi-National Park.

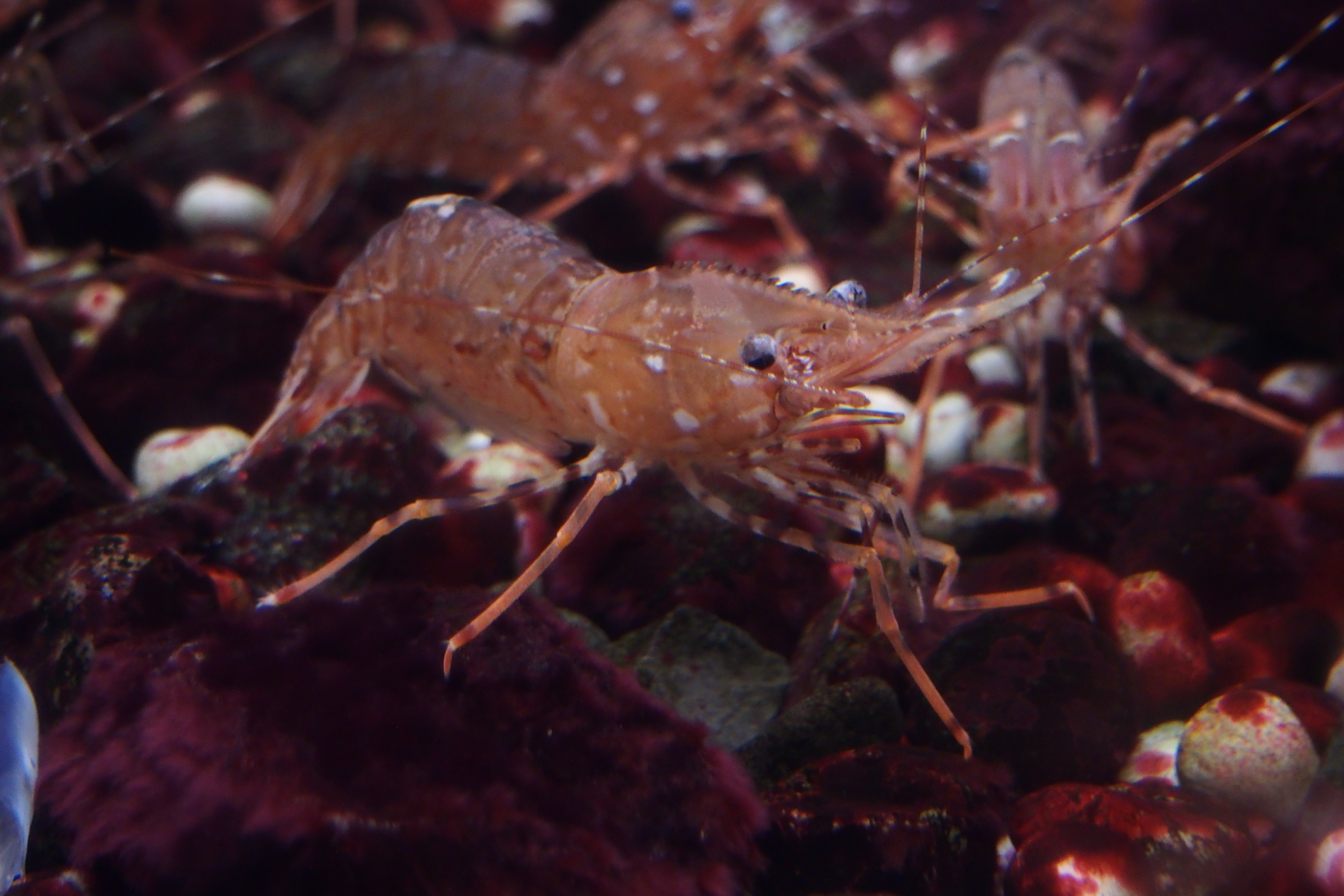
Toyama shrimp live in Toyama bay

Toyama shrimp are found in Toyama bay, which they are named after.

== Geography ==
=== Border communities ===
Toyama Prefecture
Kurobe, Uozu, Namerikawa, Toyama, Imizu, Takaoka, Himi
Ishikawa Prefecture
Nanao

=== Rivers ===
Kurobe River, Jōganji River, Jinzū River, Shō River, etc.
