= Hans-Gert Pöttering =

German lawyer, historian and conservative politician (born 1945)

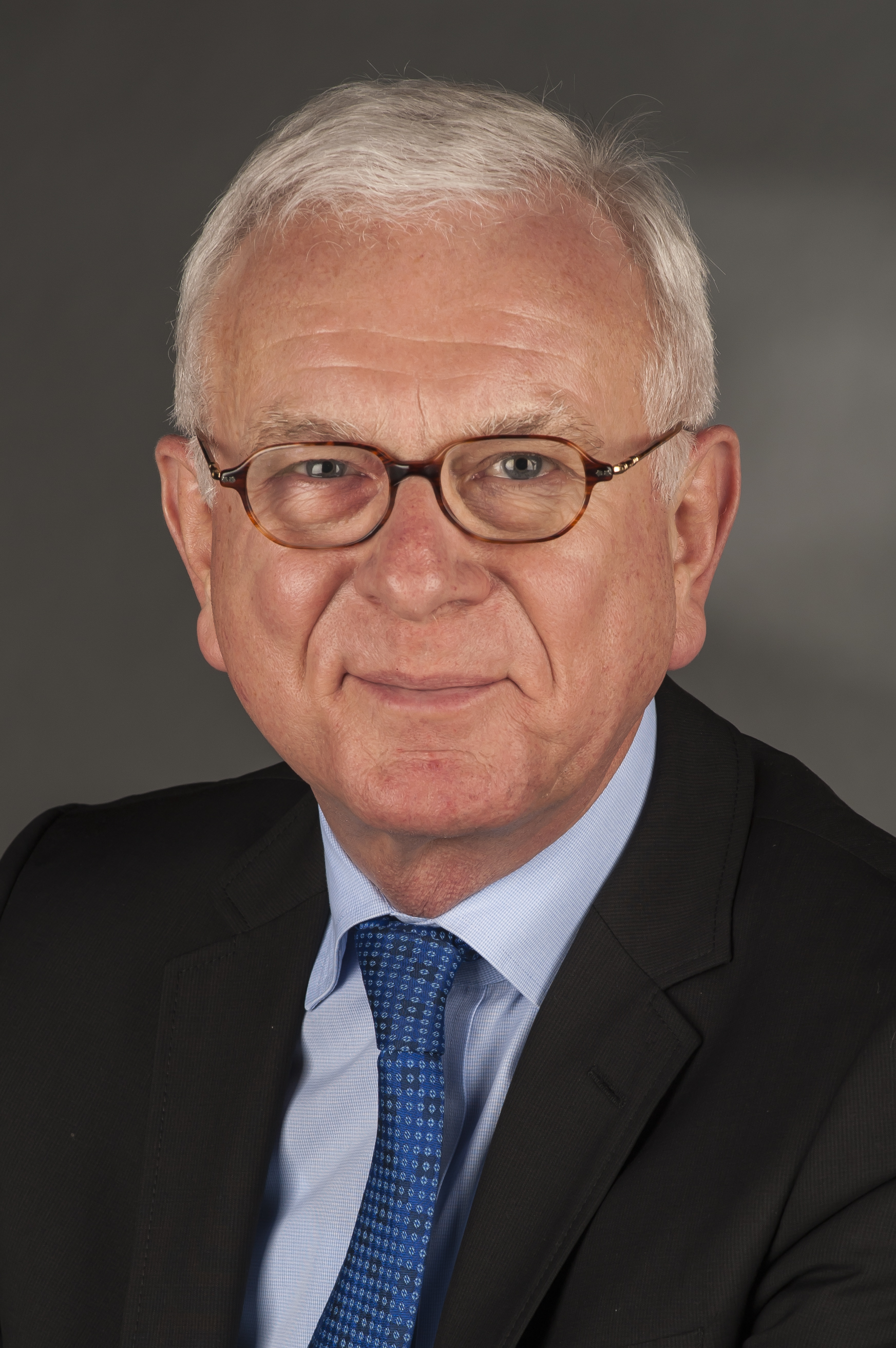
- Pöttering in 2014

President of the European Parliament
- In office 16 January 2007 – 14 July 2009
- Vice President: Rodi Kratsa-Tsagaropoulou
- Preceded by: Josep Borrell
- Succeeded by: Jerzy Buzek

Leader of the European People's Party-European Democrats
- In office 20 July 1999 – 16 January 2007
- Preceded by: Wilfried Martens
- Succeeded by: Joseph Daul

Member of the European Parliament for Germany
- In office 17 July 1979 – 30 June 2014

Chair of the Konrad Adenauer Foundation
- In office 1 January 2010 – 1 December 2018
- Preceded by: Bernhard Vogel
- Succeeded by: Norbert Lammert

Personal details
- Born: 15 September 1945 (age 81) Bersenbrück, Germany
- Party: Christian Democratic Union
- Children: Johannes; Benedict
- Education: University of Bonn; University of Geneva; Graduate Institute of International Studies; Columbia University
- Profession: Lawyer
- Website: Official website

Hans-Gert Pöttering (born 15 September 1945) is a German lawyer, historian and conservative politician (CDU, European People's Party), who served as President of the European Parliament from January 2007 to July 2009 and as Chairman of the CDU-affiliated Konrad Adenauer Foundation from 2010 to 2017.

He served as a Member of the European Parliament continuously since the first elections in 1979 until 2014 and was Chairman of the European People's Party-European Democrats 1999–2007. When he stepped down in 2014 he was the European Parliament's longest-serving member. As president of the European Parliament, he proposed the creation of the House of European History museum in Brussels.

== Early life and education ==
Pöttering never got to know his father who was killed in action during the last days of the Second World War. After Abitur and military service, he studied law, political science and history at the University of Bonn, the University of Geneva, the Graduate Institute of International Studies in Geneva and at Columbia University in New York. He took his first state exam in jurisprudence in 1973, earned a PhD in political science and history in 1974 with a dissertation on West German defence policy in the 1950s and 1960s and took his second state exam in jurisprudence in 1976, fully qualifying as an attorney.

== Political career ==
=== Member of the European Parliament, 1979–2014 ===
Pöttering was a member of the European Parliament from 1979 until 2014.

From 1984 to 1994, Pöttering was chairman of the Subcommittee on Security and Defence. From 1994 to 1996, he chaired the working group on the Intergovernmental Conference of the European People's Party (EPP) and EPP-ED Group, the results of which became the official EPP position for the Treaty of Amsterdam.

In 1994, Pöttering became Vice-President of the EPP, and from 1999 to 2007, he was the Chairman of the EPP-ED Group in the European Parliament. He was the top candidate of the CDU in the 2004 and the 2009 European elections.

Together with Volker Hassemer, he is a member of the advisory board of the pro-European initiative "A Soul for Europe". He was a member of the Reconciliation of European Histories Group.

=== President of the European Parliament, 2007–2009 ===
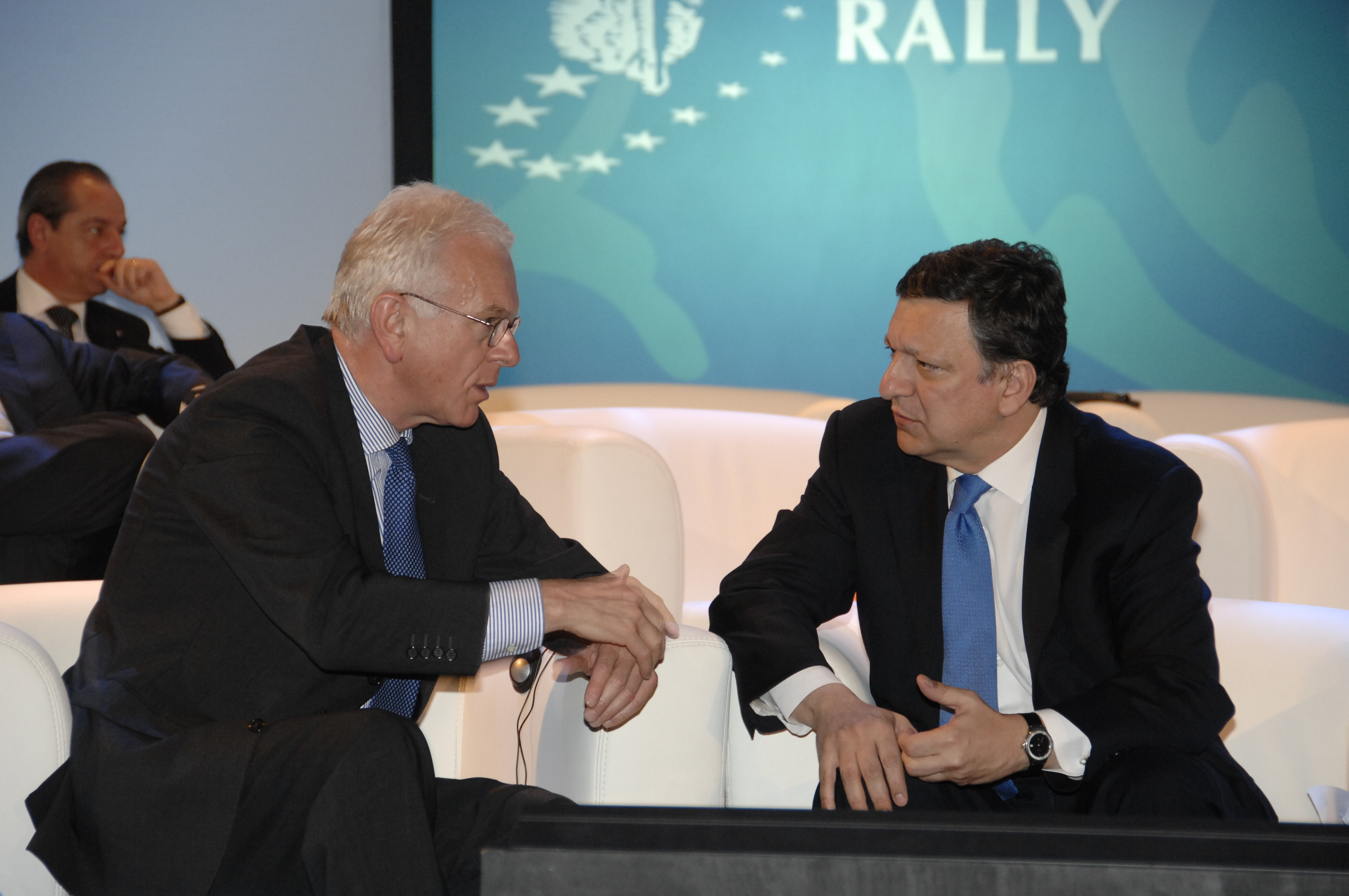
Pöttering with President of the European Commission José Manuel Barroso at the EPP Congress in Warsaw, 29 April 2009

As part of a deal with the socialist group, it was agreed that he would succeed Josep Borrell Fontelles as President of the European Parliament in the second part of the 2004–2009 term, which he did on 16 January 2007. He was elected with 450 of 689 valid votes, and defeated Italian Green Monica Frassoni, Danish Eurosceptic Jens-Peter Bonde and French Communist Francis Wurtz.

As President of the European Parliament, he initiated the House of European History project. He made reference to the House in his inaugural speech in 2007. For many years, he has been the Chairman of the Board of Trustees of the House of European History in Brussels.

=== Later career ===
On 4 December 2009, Pöttering was elected Chairman of the Konrad Adenauer Foundation from 1 January 2010; he was succeeded by Norbert Lammert in 2018.

When the EPP membership of Hungarian party Fidesz was suspended in 2019, EPP president Joseph Daul appointed Pöttering – alongside Herman van Rompuy and Wolfgang Schüssel – to a group of high-level experts who were mandated to monitor Fidesz's compliance with EPP values.

== Political positions ==
Pöttering is known as an enthusiastic European Federalist and an ally of Angela Merkel. He has stated that his priority will be to rejuvenate the European Constitution.

In February 2020, Pöttering joined around fifty former European prime ministers and foreign ministers in signing an open letter published by British newspaper The Guardian to condemn U.S. President Donald Trump's Middle East peace plan, saying it would create an apartheid-like situation in occupied Palestinian territory.

== Recognition ==
=== National honours ===
- Germany: Great Cross with Star and Sash of the Order of Merit of the Federal Republic of Germany (2010)

=== Foreign honours ===
- Austria: Grand Golden Decoration of Honour for Services to the Republic of Austria (2002)
- Holy See: Grand Cross of the Papal Order of St Gregory the Great (2007)
- Croatia: Grand Cross of the Grand Order of Queen Jelena (2007)
- Italy: 1st Class of the Order of Merit of the Italian Republic (2008)
- Ukraine: 2nd Class of the Order of Prince Jaroslaw the Wise (2008)
- Latvia: Grand Cross of the Order of the Three Stars (2009)
- Portugal: Grand Cross of the Order of Merit (Portugal) (2009)
- France: Commander of the Legion of Honour (2011)
- Spain: Grand Cross of the Order of Civil Merit of the Kingdom of Spain (2011)
- Poland: Knight Commander's Cross of the Order of Merit of the Republic of Poland (2013)
- Lithuania: Commander of the Order for Merits to Lithuania (2013)
- Hungary: Grand Cross of the Order of Merit of the Hungarian Republic (2013)
- Estonia: 1st Class of the Order of the Cross of Terra Mariana (2013)
- Romania: Grand Cross of the Order of the Star of Romania (2014)
- Tunisia: Grand Officer of the National Order of Merit of the Republic of Tunisia (2016)

=== Awards ===
- Robert Schuman Medal of EPP-ED (1995)
- Luxembourg: Mérite Européen Medal in Gold, Fondation du Mérite européen (2002)
- European Honorary Senator, the 'MEP of the Year 2004' by newspaper ‘European Voice’ (2004)
- Walter Hallstein Prize (2007)
- European Excellence Award of the Autonomous Community of Madrid ('Premio a la Excelencia Europea', 2008)
- Ben Gurion Medal of Ben Gurion University (2010)
- Polish-German Prize (2011)

=== Honorary degrees ===
- Doctor Honoris Causa of Babeş Bolyai University in Cluj-Napoca, Romania
- Doctor Honoris Causa of the University of Opole, Poland
- Doctor Honoris Causa of the University of Warmia and Mazury in Olsztyn, Poland
- Doctor Honoris Causa of the Miguel de Cervantes European University, Santiago de Chile
- Doctor Honoris Causa of Bahçeşehir University in Istanbul, Turkey
- Doctor Honoris Causa of the University of Wrocław, Poland
- Doctor Honoris Causa of Ateneo de Manila University, Philippines
- Honorary Professor at the Pontifical Catholic University of Argentina
- Doctor Honoris Causa of the University of Korea, Seoul
- Doctor Honoris Causa of the European Humanities University, Vilnius
- Honorary citizen of Bersenbrueck (Germany) and Opole (Poland)

== Other activities ==
- Friends of Europe, Member of the Board of Trustees
- Reimagine Europa, Member of the Advisory Board
- Wilfried Martens Centre for European Studies, Member of the Executive Board

== Personal life ==
Pöttering lives in Bad Iburg, Germany. He is Roman Catholic, divorced and has two sons.

== Works ==
- Adenauers Sicherheitspolitik 1955–1963. Ein Beitrag zum deutsch-amerikanischen Verhältnis, Droste Verlag 1975, ISBN 3-7700-0412-4
- Europas Vereinigte Staaten, Editio Interfrom 2000, ISBN 3-7201-5237-5, with Ludger Kühnhardt
- Weltpartner Europäische Union, Edition Interfrom 2001, ISBN 3-7201-5252-9, with Ludger Kühnhardt
- Kontinent Europa. Kern, Übergänge, Grenzen, Edition Interfrom 2002, ISBN 3-7201-5276-6, zusammen mit Ludger Kühnhardt
- Von der Vision zur Wirklichkeit. Auf dem Weg zur Einigung Europas, Bouvier 2004, ISBN 3-416-03053-2
- United for the Better: My European Way, John Harper Publishing 2016, ISBN 978-09-934549-67

Party political offices
| Preceded by Wilfried Martens | Leader of the European People's Party-European Democrats; 1999–2007 | Succeeded by Joseph Daul |
Political offices
| Preceded by Josep Borrell | President of the European Parliament; 2007–2009 | Succeeded by Jerzy Buzek |
