= Peter Gullestad =

Norwegian civil servant

Peter Andreas Gullestad (born 25 September 1948) is a Norwegian civil servant.

He was born in Bergen, and took the cand.oecon. degree in 1976. He was hired in the Norwegian Directorate of Fisheries in 1977, and climbed in the hierarchy to become assisting director in 1995. From 1996 to 2008 he served as director.

Civic offices
Preceded by Viggo Jan Olsen	Director of the Norwegian Directorate of Fisheries; 1996–2008	Succeeded by Liv Holmefjord
