= Ensifer =

Ensifer, sword-bearer in Latin, may refer to:

- Spatharios, a type of Roman body guards
- Ensifer (bacterium), a genus of nitrogen-fixing bacteria

== See also ==
- Ensifera
- Ensiferum, a Finnish folk metal band
