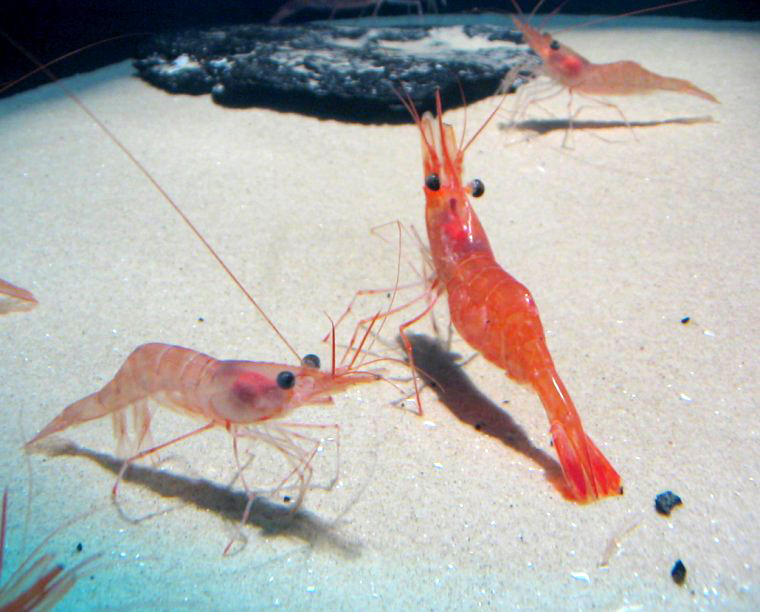

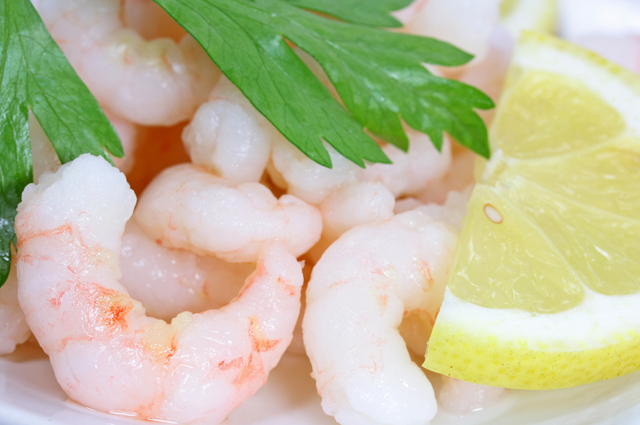
- Living at Nordsøen Oceanarium (above), deshelled as typically sold for human consumption (below)

Scientific classification
- Kingdom: Animalia
- Phylum: Arthropoda
- Class: Malacostraca
- Order: Decapoda
- Suborder: Pleocyemata
- Infraorder: Caridea
- Family: Pandalidae
- Genus: Pandalus
- Species: P. borealis

Binomial name
- Pandalus borealis Krøyer, 1838

= Pandalus borealis =

Species of crustacean (caridean shrimp)

Pandalus borealis is a species of caridean shrimp found in cold parts of the northern Atlantic and northern Pacific Oceans, although the latter population now often is regarded as a separate species, P. eous. The Food and Agriculture Organization refers to them as the northern prawn. Other common names include pink shrimp, deepwater prawn, deep-sea prawn, Nordic shrimp, great northern prawn, northern shrimp, coldwater prawn and Maine shrimp.

== Distribution ==
Pandalus borealis usually lives on a soft muddy bottoms at depths of 20 to 1,330 m (66–4,364 ft), in waters with a temperature of 0 to 8 °C (32–46 °F), although it has been recorded from 9 to 1,450 m (30–4,757 ft) and −2 to 12 °C (28–54 °F). P. borealis thrives in waters where the salinity ranges between 32 and 35 ppt, depending on where the shrimp are at in their life cycle. The distribution of the North Atlantic nominate subspecies P. b. borealis ranges from New England in the United States, Canada's eastern seaboard (off Newfoundland and Labrador and eastern Baffin Island in Nunavut), southern and eastern Greenland, Iceland, Svalbard, Norway and the North Sea as far south as the English Channel. The North Pacific P. b. eous is found from Japan and Korea, through the Sea of Okhotsk, across the Bering Strait, and as far south as the U.S. state of California. Instead of regarding it as a subspecies, the North Pacific population is often recognized as a separate species, P. eous.

== Ecology ==
Trophic DNA metabarcoding studies show that Pandalus borealis plays a key role in Arctic food webs, by feeding on a diverse array of prey, including gelatinous zooplankton and chaetognaths. High diversity of fish DNA can also be detected in their stomachs, probably as a result of their role as generalized scavengers. This has led some authors to propose Pandalus borealis as an efficient natural sampler for assessing molecular fish diversity in Arctic marine ecosystems.

== Physiology ==
In their up to eight-year lifespan, males can reach a length of 12 cm (4.7 in), while females can reach 16.5 cm (6.5 in) long, although typical sizes are much smaller. The size of Pandalus borealis individuals can differ based on age, temperature of the environment and sex. Higher temperature water has been associated with faster growth.

The shrimp are hermaphroditic, specifically protandrous hermaphrodites. They are born as male, but after approximately two and a half years, their testes turn to ovaries and they complete their lives as females. Northern shrimp's spawning season begins in the late summer, usually offshore. By early fall the females will start to extrude their eggs onto their abdomen. This is when they will move inshore where their eggs will hatch in the winter.

== Commercial fishing ==
Global capture production of Northern prawn (Pandalus borealis) in thousand tonnes from 1950 to 2022, as reported by the FAO

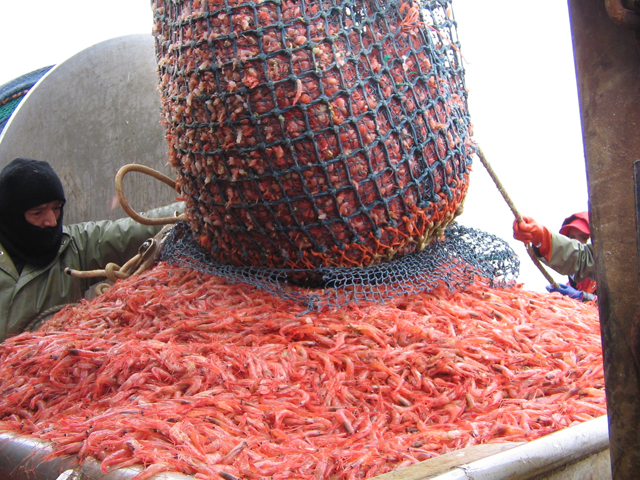
Hauled aboard a shrimp boat

Pandalus borealis is an important food resource, and has been widely fished since the early 1900s in Norway, and later in other countries following Johan Hjort's practical discoveries of how to locate them. In Canada, these shrimp are sold peeled, cooked and frozen in bags in supermarkets, and are consumed as appetizers.

Northern shrimp have a short life, which contributes to a variable stock on a yearly basis. However, the species is not considered overfished due to a large amount reported and a large amount harvested.

In Canada, the annual harvest limit is set to 164,000 tonnes (2008). The Canadian fishery began in the 1980s and expanded in 1990s.

In New England, Northern Shrimp were a valuable fishery stock from the late 1950s to 1978. Pandalus borealis was in high demand due to it being considered sweeter and tastier than Pacific Shrimp. Fishery production peaked in 1969 with landings at 28.3 million pounds.

In 2013, the Atlantic States Marine Fisheries Commission (which covers the Atlantic seaboard of the United States) determined that their stocks of P. borealis were too low and shut down the New England fishery. This was the first cancellation in 35 years.

The fishery has yet to recover since it collapsed and studies from 2018 report that Northern Shrimp still remain in a depleted condition. With temperatures increasing yearly, and a low spawning stock biomass (SSB), the spawning conditions for Northern Shrimp remain unfavorable. Colder temperatures and higher spawning biomass would increase the recruitment and increase the population size in the long run. However, surface temperatures are continuing to rise yearly off the coast of Maine due to climate change and impacting the region's marine fisheries.

== Uses ==
Beyond human consumption, shrimp alkaline phosphatase (SAP), an enzyme used in molecular biology, is obtained from Pandalus borealis, and the species' carapace is a source of chitosan, a versatile chemical used for such different applications as treating bleeding wounds, filtering wine or improving the soil in organic farming.
