= Walter Hallstein Prize =

The Walter Hallstein Prize (German: Walter-Hallstein-Preis) is a prize that, from 2002 to 2008, was awarded every November by the Goethe University Frankfurt, the town of Frankfurt am Main and the Dresdner Bank AG for outstanding services to the cause of European integration. The prize had a cash value of 20,000 euros.

The award ceremony was held in the Römer in Frankfurt and used to be part of the Hallstein Colloquium, which is an academic colloquium organized by the Wilhelm Merton Centre for European Integration and International Economic Order at the University of Frankfurt. The prize was named after Walter Hallstein, the president of the first commission of the European Economic Community.

== Laureates ==
- 2002 Ralf Dahrendorf
- 2003 Gil Carlos Rodríguez Iglesias, president of the European Court of Justice from 1994 to 2003
- 2004 Wim Duisenberg, former president of the European Central Bank
- 2005 Jean-Claude Juncker, Prime Minister of Luxembourg
- 2006 Vaira Vīķe-Freiberga, President of Latvia
- 2007 Hans-Gert Pöttering, President of the European Parliament
- 2008 Claudio Magris, Italienischer author
