= Klaus Sunnanå =

Klaus Sunnanå (29 January 1905 – 22 January 1980) was a Norwegian Mot Dag member, economist and fisheries director.

He was born in Avaldsnes as a son of teacher and farmer Knut Andreas Søndenaa (1871–1948) and Lisa Kristine Thuestad (1880–1958). He took his secondary education at Vossavangen in 1926, and graduated from the Royal Frederick University with the cand.oecon. degree in 1930. He was a member of Mot Dag, and chaired the Norwegian Students' Society in 1932. As a Mot Dag member, he was a prolific contributor to Arbeidernes leksikon, and Sunnanå followed as the organization became merged into the Labour Party in 1936.

In 1935 Sunnanå was hired in the Norwegian Directorate of Fisheries. His publication Lofotfiskets lønnsomhet in 1936 was perhaps the world's first publication within fishery economics. In 1938 he became a secretary in the Norges Fiskarlag. He had to leave Norway in 1941 due to the German occupation of Norway, and travelled via Sweden to the United Kingdom, where he found work in the Ministry of Provisioning-in-exile. After the war, from 1945 to 1947, he chaired Det økonomiske samordningsråd.

From 1948 to his retirement in 1973 he served as the director of the Directorate of Fisheries. He also served as chairman of the Organisation for European Economic Co-operation subcommittee for fisheries from 1949 to 1958 and the Food and Agriculture Organization Department of Fisheries and Aquaculture from 1970 to 1972. He was also involved in the Norwegian development aid project in Kerala. The first Norwegian development aid project, it has been described as "an experiment for former Mot-Dag-ists". A significant motivation for the project was to please the leftist opposition within the Labour Party in a time of NATO membership and increased spendings on defence.

Satisfying the leftist opposition could not prevent a party split in the long run. In 1962 Sunnanå joined the group Aksjon mot norsk medlemskap i Fellesmarkedet – de 143, a group of 143 people, many of them former Mot Dag members, who opposed Norwegian membership in the European Community. In 1972 Sunnanå left the Labour Party and instead supported the Socialist People's Party. He has been called "the Karl Evang of the fisheries sector", due to their similar career paths: Mot Dag membership, directorate leadership for many years, international organization involvement, involvement in the Kerala project as well as membership of the Labour Party until breaking out in the 1970s.

Sunnanå was decorated as a Commander of the Royal Norwegian Order of St. Olav in 1974. He was married twice, and was an uncle of Lars Sigurd Sunnanå. He died in January 1980 in Bergen.

Civic offices
| Preceded by Ola Brynjelsen | Director of the Norwegian Directorate of Fisheries; 1948–1973 | Succeeded by Knut Vartdal |
