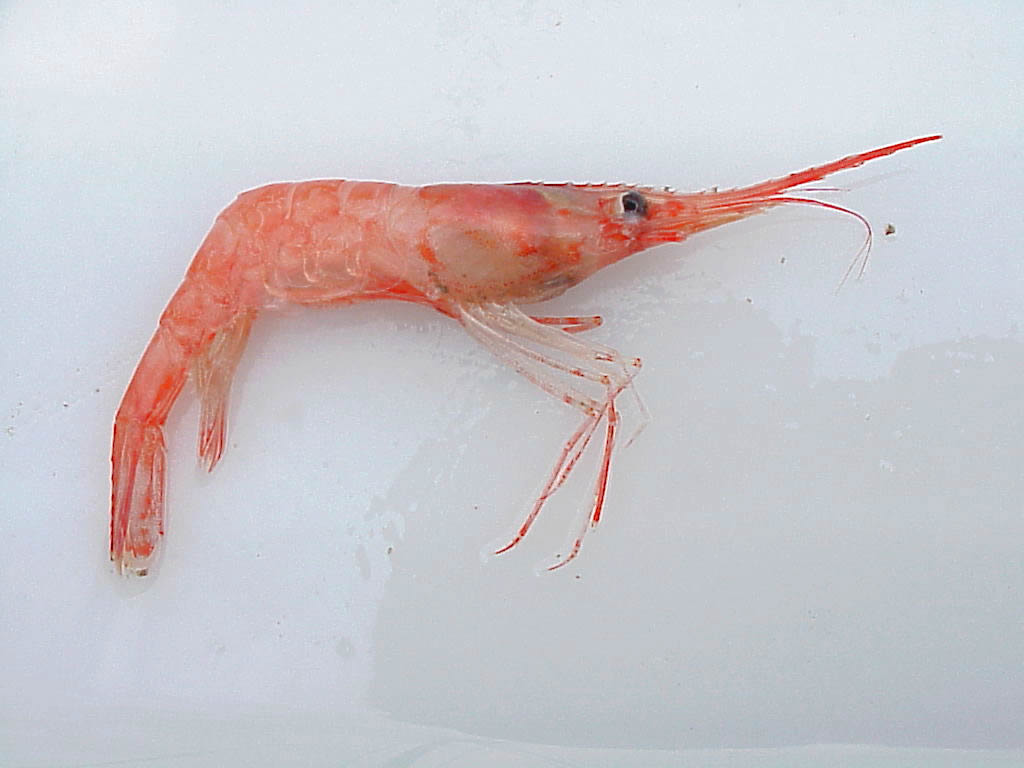
- Pandalus borealis

Scientific classification
- Kingdom: Animalia
- Phylum: Arthropoda
- Clade: Pancrustacea
- Class: Malacostraca
- Order: Decapoda
- Suborder: Pleocyemata
- Infraorder: Caridea
- Superfamily: Pandaloidea
- Family: Pandalidae; Haworth, 1825

= Pandalidae =

Family of crustaceans

The family Pandalidae is a taxon of caridean shrimp. These species are commonly called pandalid shrimp. They are edible and have high economic value. They are characterised by the subdivided carpus of the second pereiopod and, mainly, by the lack of the chelae (claws) on the first pereiopod. This is a cold-water family, and their representation in tropical areas is made by deep-sea shrimp. The genus Physetocaris, sometimes placed in this family, is now considered to be in its own family, Physetocarididae.

== Genera ==
The following genera are currently classified in the family Pandalidae:

- Amphionides H. Milne-Edwards, 1833
- Anachlorocurtis Hayashi, 1975
- Atlantopandalus Komai, 1999
- Austropandalus Holthuis, 1952
- Bitias Fransen, 1990
- Calipandalus Komai & Chan, 2003
- Chelonika Fransen, 1997
- Chlorocurtis Kemp, 1925
- Chlorotocella Balss, 1914
- Chlorotocus A. Milne-Edwards, 1882
- Dichelopandalus Caullery, 1896
- Dorodotes Bate, 1888
- Heterocarpus A. Milne-Edwards, 1881b
- Miropandalus Bruce, 1983
- Notopandalus Yaldwyn, 1960
- Pandalina Calman, 1899
- Pandalus Leach, 1814
- Pantomus A. Milne-Edwards, 1883
- Peripandalus De Man, 1917
- Plesionika Bate, 1888
- Procletes Bate, 1888
- Pseudopandalus Crosnier, 1997
- Stylopandalus Coutière, 1905
