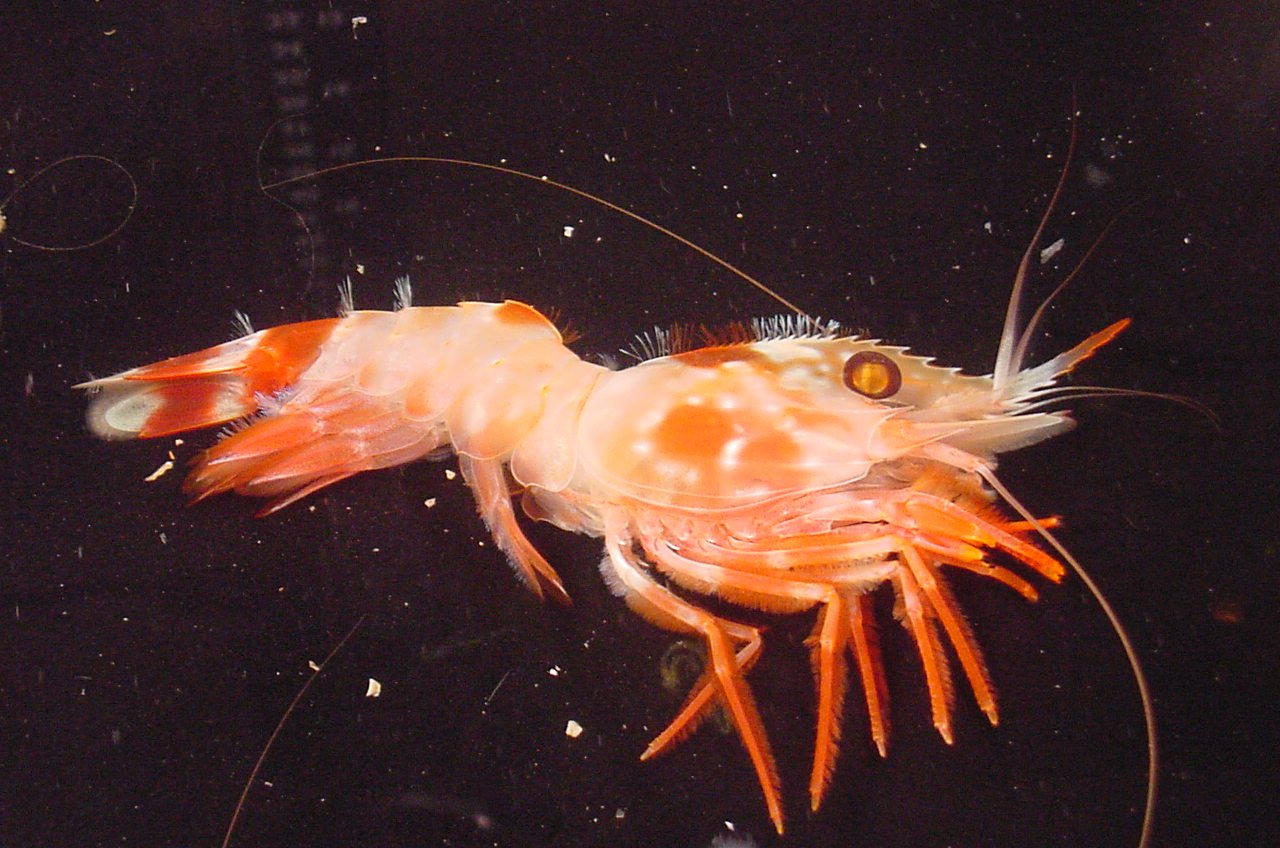

Scientific classification
- Domain: Eukaryota
- Kingdom: Animalia
- Phylum: Arthropoda
- Class: Malacostraca
- Order: Decapoda
- Suborder: Pleocyemata
- Infraorder: Caridea
- Family: Eugonatonotidae
- Genus: Eugonatonotus
- Species: E. crassus

Binomial name
- Eugonatonotus crassus (A. Milne-Edwards, 1881)

= Eugonatonotus crassus =

Species of crustacean

Eugonatonotus crassus is a species of crustacean first described by Alphonse Milne-Edwards in 1881.
