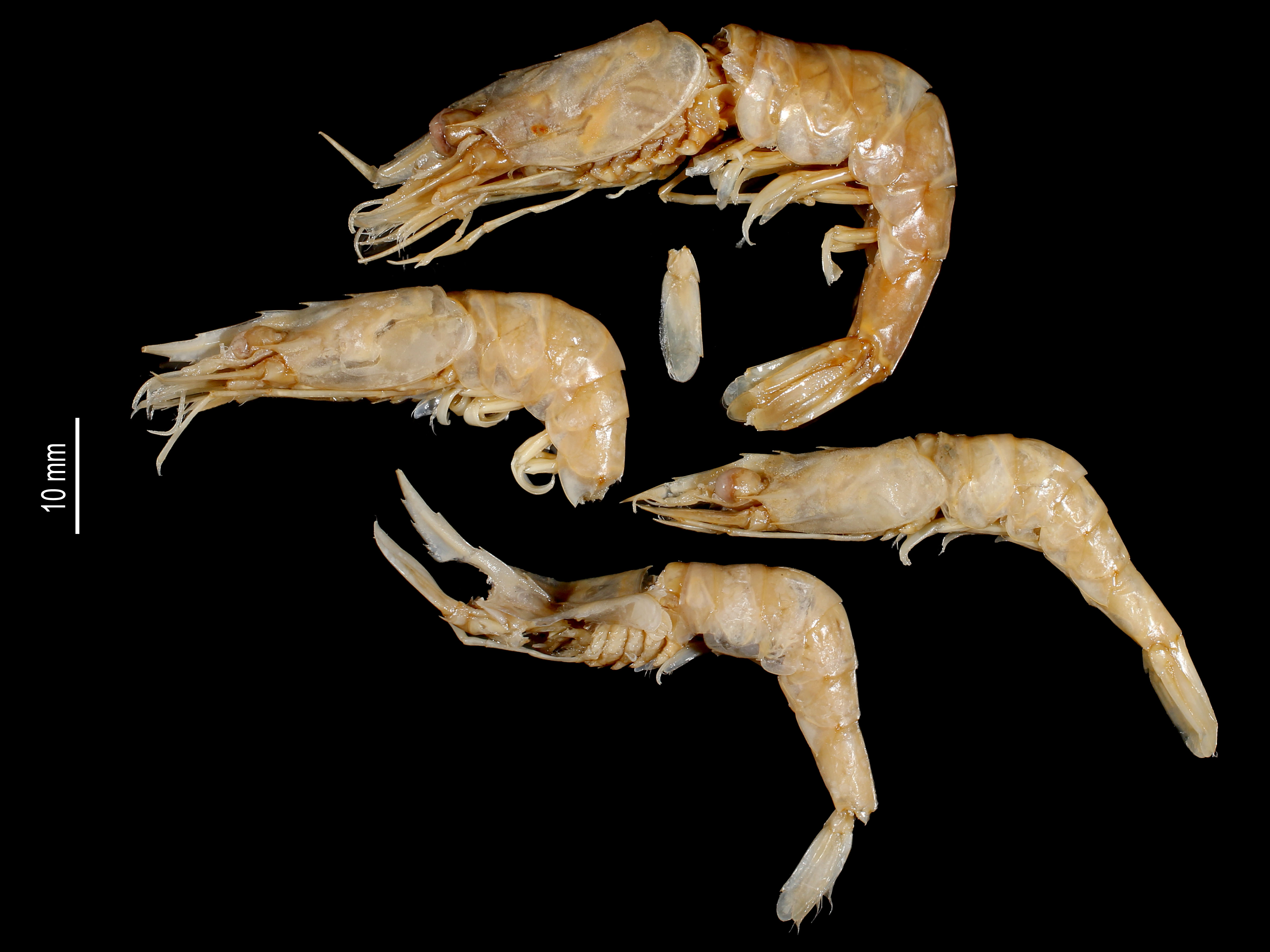
- Campylonotus vagans

Scientific classification
- Domain: Eukaryota
- Kingdom: Animalia
- Phylum: Arthropoda
- Class: Malacostraca
- Order: Decapoda
- Suborder: Pleocyemata
- Infraorder: Caridea
- Superfamily: Campylonotoidea
- Family: Campylonotidae
- Genus: Campylonotus; Spence Bate, 1888

= Campylonotus =

Genus of crustaceans

Campylonotus is a genus of true shrimp belonging to the monotypic family Campylonotidae. The species of this genus are found in southernmost Southern Hemisphere and are as follows:

- Campylonotus arntzianus Thatje, 2003
- Campylonotus capensis Spence Bate, 1888
- Campylonotus rathbunae Schmitt, 1926
- Campylonotus semistriatus Spence Bate, 1888
- Campylonotus vagans Spence Bate, 1888
