= Xiphocaris elongata =

Conservation status
- Least Concern (IUCN 3.1)

Scientific classification
- Kingdom: Animalia
- Phylum: Arthropoda
- Class: Malacostraca
- Order: Decapoda
- Suborder: Pleocyemata
- Infraorder: Caridea
- Family: Xiphocarididae
- Genus: Xiphocaris
- Species: X. elongata

Binomial name
- Xiphocaris elongata (Guérin-Méneville, 1855)

Species of crustacean

Xiphocaris elongata, the yellow-nose shrimp, yellow rhino shrimp, salpiche or piquine, is a species of freshwater shrimp native to the Caribbean. A hardy species, this shrimp is tolerant of a wide range of water conditions and can even survive in brackish and saltwater. Despite it being widely encountered across the Caribbean this species is still virtually unavailable to hobbyists in Europe and North America. It is rated least concern by the IUCN.

== Habitat ==
Mostly found near the rivers, streams and ponds, the Xiphocaris Elongata is seen in the tropical region. Aquatic plants can be found surrounding it while they prefer slow moving water.
