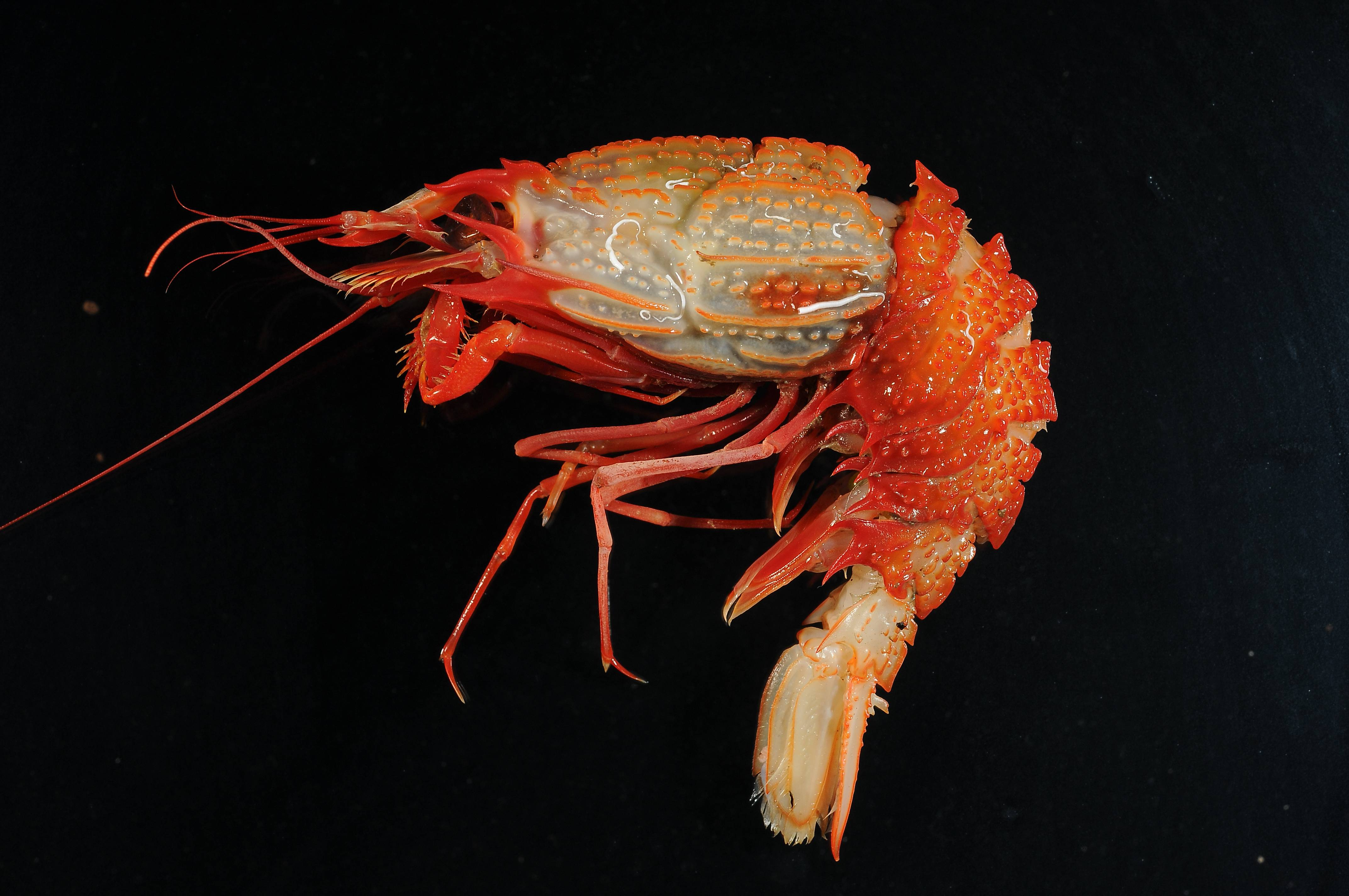

Scientific classification
- Domain: Eukaryota
- Kingdom: Animalia
- Phylum: Arthropoda
- Class: Malacostraca
- Order: Decapoda
- Suborder: Pleocyemata
- Infraorder: Caridea
- Superfamily: Crangonoidea
- Family: Glyphocrangonidae

= Glyphocrangonidae =

Family of crustaceans

Glyphocrangonidae is a family of crustaceans belonging to the order Decapoda.

Genera:

- Armacrangon Charbonnier, Audo, Garassino & Hyžný, 2017
- Gladicrangon Charbonnier, Audo, Garassino & Hyžný, 2017
- Glyphocrangon Milne-Edwards, 1881
