= Bathypalaemonellidae =

Scientific classification
- Domain: Eukaryota
- Kingdom: Animalia
- Phylum: Arthropoda
- Class: Malacostraca
- Order: Decapoda
- Suborder: Pleocyemata
- Infraorder: Caridea
- Superfamily: Campylonotoidea
- Family: Bathypalaemonellidae

Family of crustaceans

Bathypalaemonellidae is a family of crustaceans belonging to the order Decapoda.

The family consists of two genera:

- Bathypalaemonella Balss, 1914
- Bathypalaemonetes Cleva, 2001
