= Xiphocaris =

Scientific classification
- Domain: Eukaryota
- Kingdom: Animalia
- Phylum: Arthropoda
- Class: Malacostraca
- Order: Decapoda
- Suborder: Pleocyemata
- Infraorder: Caridea
- Superfamily: Nematocarcinoidea
- Family: Xiphocarididae; Ortmann, 1895
- Genus: Xiphocaris von Martens, 1872

Genus of crustaceans

Xiphocaris is a genus of crustaceans belonging to the monotypic family Xiphocarididae.

The species of this genus are found in the Caribbean.

Species:

- Xiphocaris elongata (Guérin-Méneville, 1855)
- Xiphocaris gomezi Juarrero de Varona, 1993
