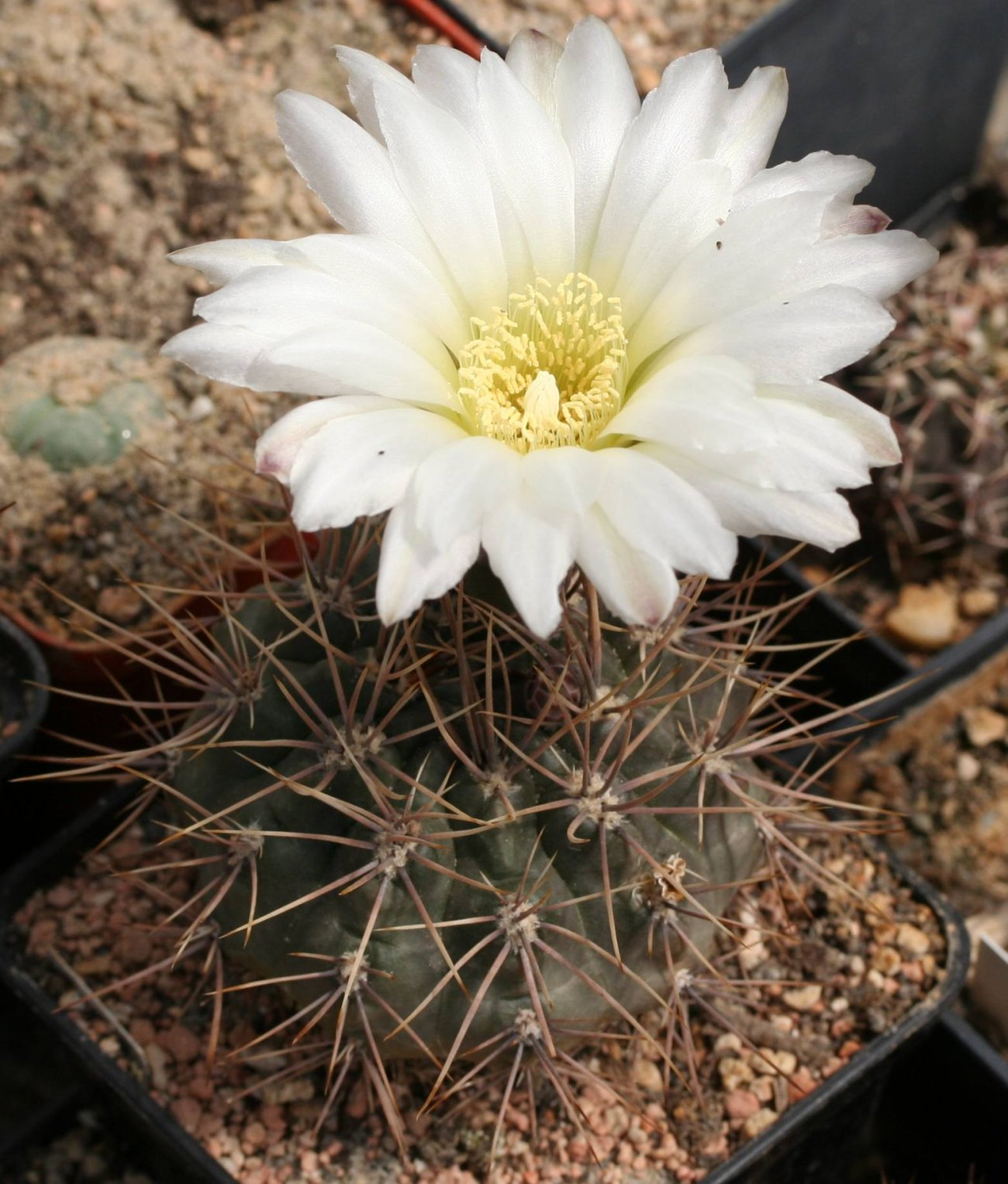

Conservation status
- Least Concern (IUCN 3.1)

Scientific classification
- Kingdom: Plantae
- Clade: Tracheophytes
- Clade: Angiosperms
- Clade: Eudicots
- Order: Caryophyllales
- Family: Cactaceae
- Subfamily: Cactoideae
- Genus: Gymnocalycium
- Species: G. gibbosum

Binomial name
- Gymnocalycium gibbosum (Haw.) Pfeiff. ex Mittler 1845

Synonyms
- Cactus gibbosus Haw. 1816; Cereus gibbosus (Haw.) Sweet 1826; Echinocactus gibbosus (Haw.) DC. 1828; Echinocactus gibbosus var. typica Speg. 1905

= Gymnocalycium gibbosum =

Species of cactus

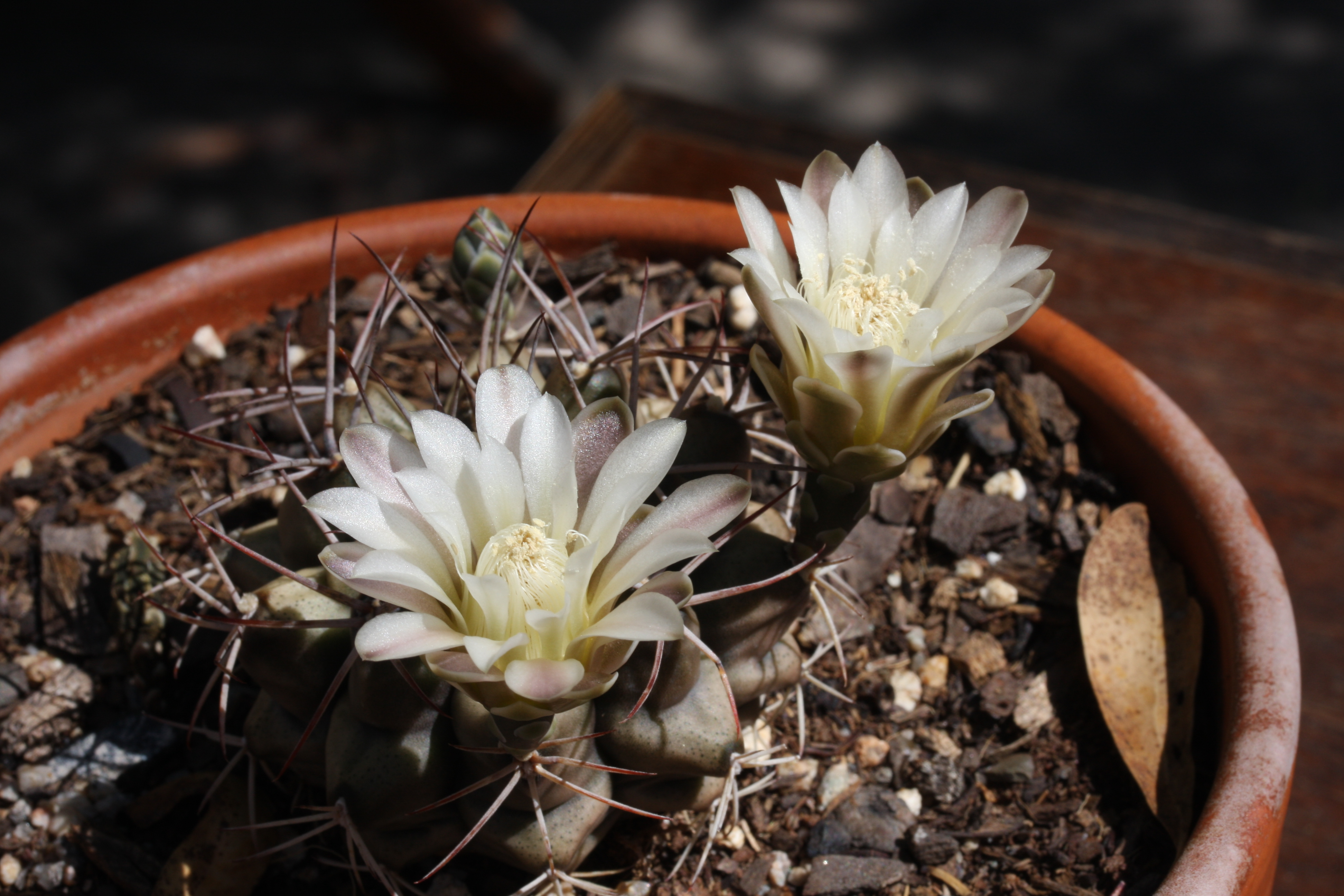
Gymnocalycium gibbosum var. nobile in flower.

Gymnocalycium gibbosum is a species of Gymnocalycium from Argentina.

== Description ==
Gymnocalycium gibbosum usually grows singly with dark blue-green, spherical to short cylindrical shoots that reach a diameter of 10 to 12 centimeters. The twelve to 19 ribs are noticeably notched. The one to three central spines are often missing. The seven to 15 straight, stiff, light brown to almost black marginal spines are up to 3.5 centimeters long.

The white or sometimes reddish flowers are up to 6 centimeters long. The dark green fruits are club-shaped.

=== Subspecies ===
There are two recognized subspecies.

Image	Name	Distribution
	Gymnocalycium gibbosum subsp. borthii (Koop ex H.Till) G.J.Charles	Argentina (San Luis)
	Gymnocalycium gibbosum subsp. gibbosum	Argentina

== Distribution ==
Gymnocalycium gibbosum is widespread from central to southern Argentina up to altitudes of 1000 meters.

== Taxonomy ==
The first description as Cactus gibbosus was made in 1816 by Adrian Hardy Haworth. Ludwig Mittler placed the species in the genus Gymnocalycium in 1844. Other nomenclature synonyms are Cereus gibbosus (Haw.) Sweet (1826), Echinocactus gibbosus (Haw.) DC. (1828) and Cereus gibbosus (Haw.) Pfeiff. (1837, nom. illegal).
