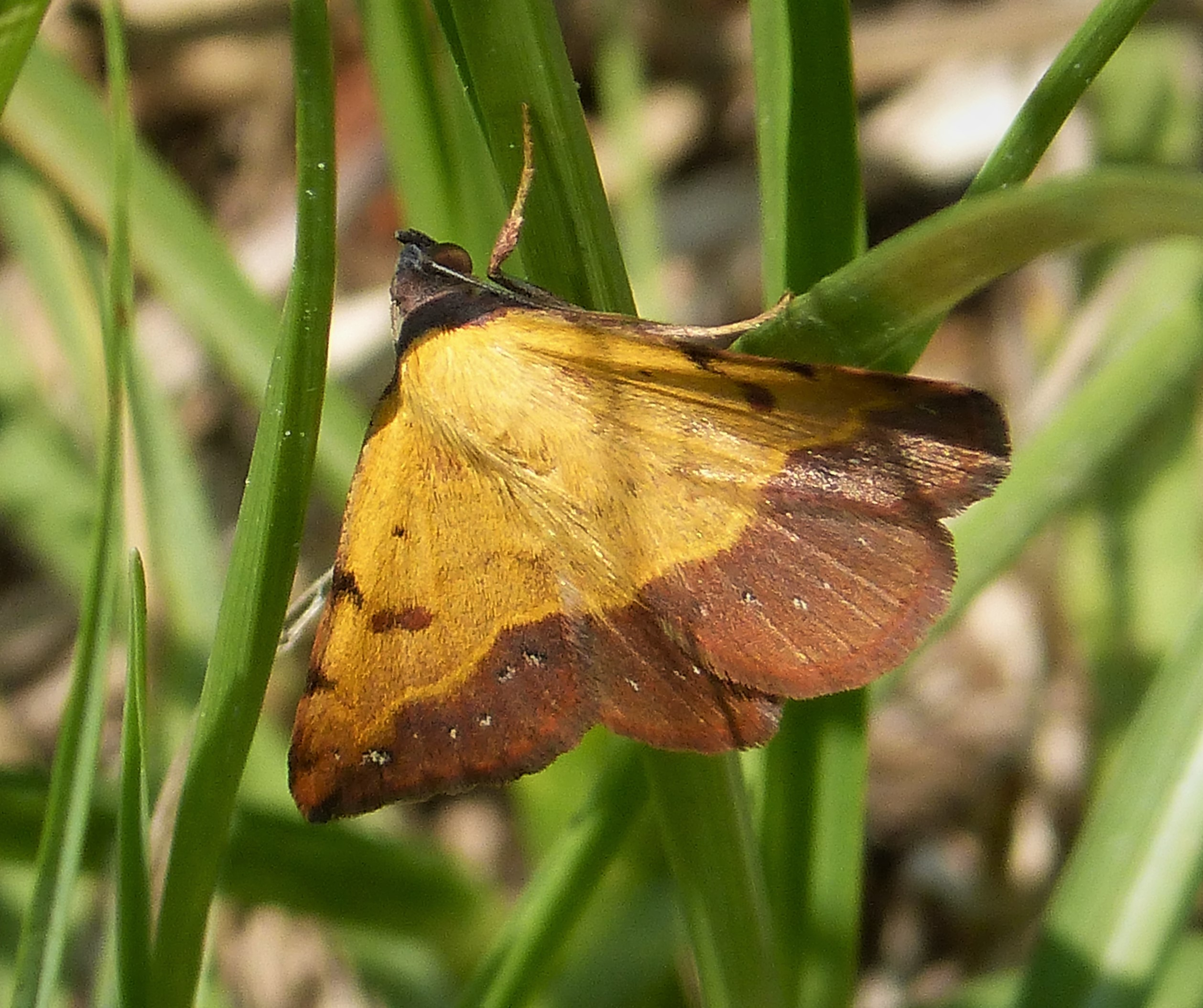

Scientific classification
- Kingdom: Animalia
- Phylum: Arthropoda
- Clade: Pancrustacea
- Class: Insecta
- Order: Lepidoptera
- Superfamily: Noctuoidea
- Family: Erebidae
- Genus: Hemeroplanis
- Species: H. scopulepes

Binomial name
- Hemeroplanis scopulepes (Haworth, 1809)

= Hemeroplanis scopulepes =

Species of moth

Hemeroplanis scopulepes, the variable tropic, is a moth in the family Erebidae. The species was first described by Adrian Hardy Haworth in 1809. It is found in North America.

The MONA or Hodges number for Hemeroplanis scopulepes is 8467.
