= Leiothorax =

Leiothorax Temporal range: Triassic

Scientific classification
- Kingdom: Animalia
- Phylum: Arthropoda
- Class: Malacostraca
- Order: Decapoda
- Suborder: Pleocyemata
- Infraorder: Caridea
- Genus: †Leiothorax; Pinna, 1974
- Species: †L. triasicus

Binomial name
- †Leiothorax triasicus Pinna, 1974

Extinct genus of crustaceans

Leiothorax is an extinct genus of shrimp in the order Decapoda. It contains the species Leiothorax triasicus.
