= Galatheacaris =

Scientific classification
- Kingdom: Animalia
- Phylum: Arthropoda
- Subphylum: Crustacea
- Class: Malacostraca
- Order: Decapoda
- Infraorder: Caridea
- Superfamily: Galatheacaridoidea Vereshchaka, 1997
- Family: Galatheacarididae Vereshchaka, 1997
- Genus: Galatheacaris Vereshchaka, 1997
- Species: G. abyssalis

Binomial name
- Galatheacaris abyssalis Vereshchaka, 1997

Genus of crustaceans

Galatheacaris abyssalis is a rare species of shrimp, now thought to be a larval stage of another genus, Eugonatonotus.

It was described in 1997 on the basis of a single specimen caught in the Celebes Sea at a depth of 5,000 metres (16,000 ft). It was seen to be so different from previously known shrimp species that a new family, Galatheacarididae, and superfamily, Galatheacaridoidea, were erected for it. Later, more specimens were found in the stomach of a lancetfish, Alepisaurus ferox.

The species shares some plesiomorphies with Procaris, and the two taxa were thought to be closely related. Molecular phylogenetic analyses showed that Galatheacaris abyssalis had such similar mitochondrial DNA to that of Eugonatonotus chacei that the two must be considered conspecific; it is now thought that Galatheacaris is the megalopa stage of Eugonatonotus.
