= Acanthinopus =

Acanthinopus Temporal range: Norian

Scientific classification
- Kingdom: Animalia
- Phylum: Arthropoda
- Clade: Pancrustacea
- Class: Malacostraca
- Order: Decapoda
- Suborder: Pleocyemata
- Infraorder: Caridea
- Family: incertae sedis
- Genus: †Acanthinopus; Pinna, 1974
- Species: †A. gibbosus

Binomial name
- †Acanthinopus gibbosus Pinna, 1974

Extinct genus of crustaceans

Acanthinopus gibbosus is an extinct species of shrimp placed in its own genus, Acanthinopus, which has not been assigned to a family. It was found in Norian (Upper Triassic) sediments of the Zorzino Limestone in northern Italy.
