= Gampsurus =

Gampsurus Temporal range: Campanian

Scientific classification
- Kingdom: Animalia
- Phylum: Arthropoda
- Class: Malacostraca
- Order: Decapoda
- Suborder: Pleocyemata
- Infraorder: Caridea
- Family: incertae sedis
- Genus: †Gampsurus; Von der Marck, 1863
- Species: †G. dubius

Binomial name
- †Gampsurus dubius Von der Marck, 1863

Extinct genus of crustaceans

Gampsurus is an extinct genus of shrimp in the order Decapoda. It existed in Germany during the Campanian stage of the Cretaceous period. It contains a single species, Gampsurus dubius.
