= Buergerocaris =

Buergerocaris Temporal range: Tithonian

Scientific classification
- Kingdom: Animalia
- Phylum: Arthropoda
- Class: Malacostraca
- Order: Decapoda
- Suborder: Pleocyemata
- Infraorder: Caridea
- Family: incertae sedis
- Genus: †Buergerocaris; Schweigert & Garassino, 2004
- Species: †B. psittacoides

Binomial name
- †Buergerocaris psittacoides Schweigert & Garassino, 2004

Extinct genus of crustaceans

Buergerocaris is an extinct genus of shrimp, containing only one species, Buergerocaris psittacoides.
