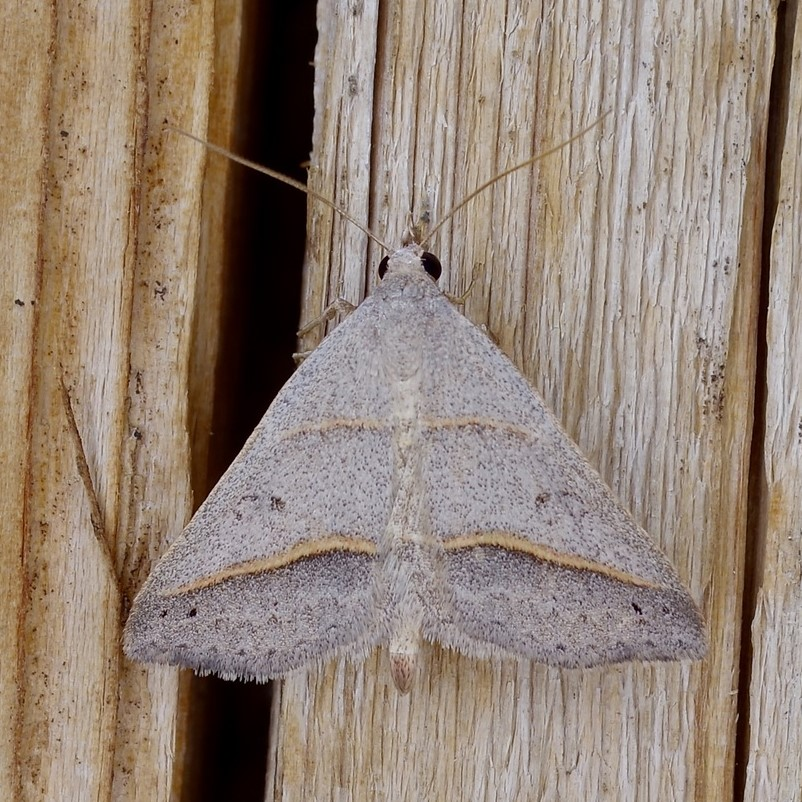

Scientific classification
- Kingdom: Animalia
- Phylum: Arthropoda
- Clade: Pancrustacea
- Class: Insecta
- Order: Lepidoptera
- Superfamily: Noctuoidea
- Family: Erebidae
- Genus: Hemeroplanis
- Species: H. trilineosa

Binomial name
- Hemeroplanis trilineosa (Dyar, 1918)

= Hemeroplanis trilineosa =

Species of moth

Hemeroplanis trilineosa is a species of moth in the family Erebidae.
