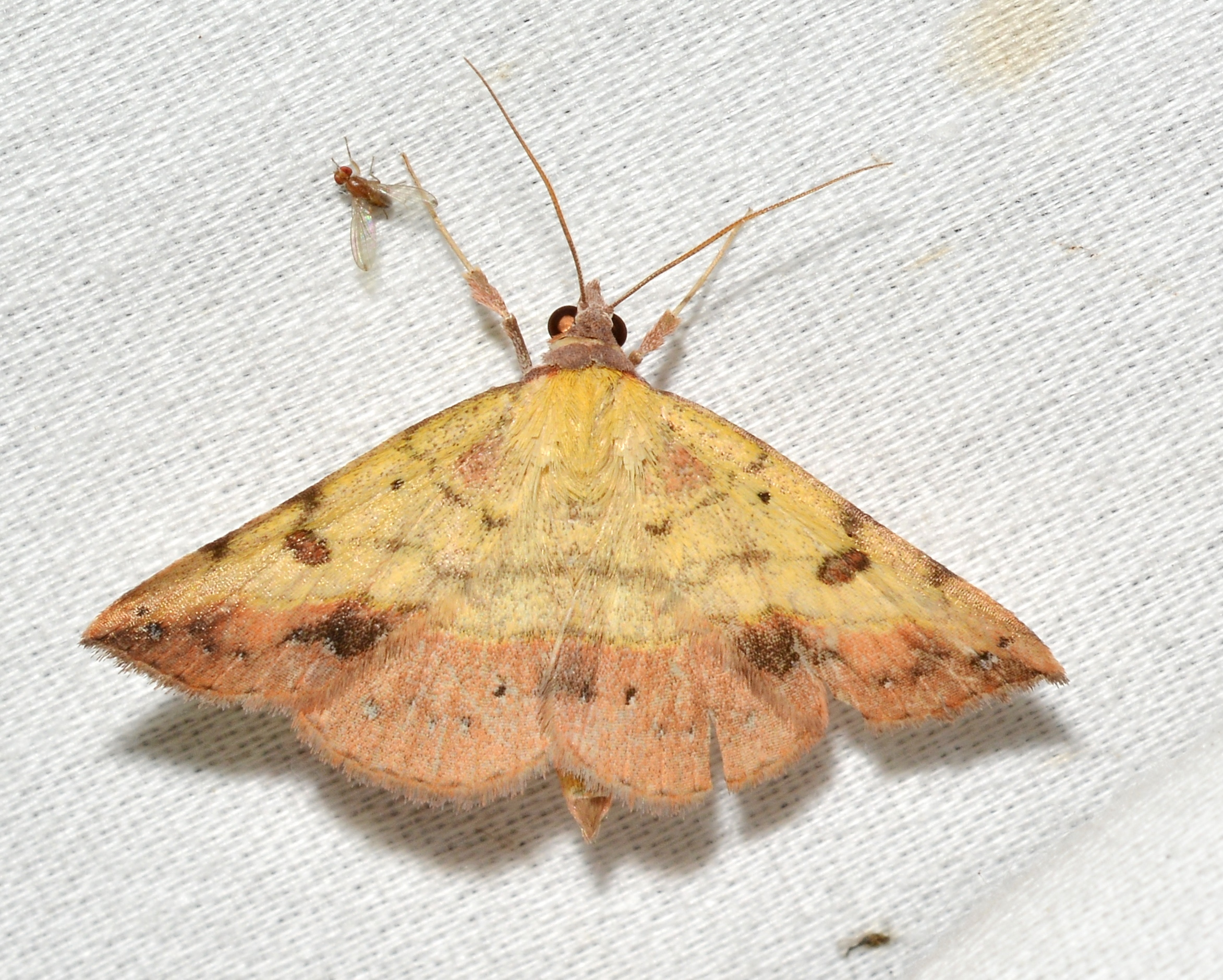
- Hemeroplanis scopulepes

Scientific classification
- Kingdom: Animalia
- Phylum: Arthropoda
- Clade: Pancrustacea
- Class: Insecta
- Order: Lepidoptera
- Superfamily: Noctuoidea
- Family: Erebidae
- Subfamily: Boletobiinae
- Genus: Hemeroplanis; Hübner, 1818

Synonyms
- Scopelopus Stephens, 1829; Sanacea Walker, [1866]; Pleonectyptera Grote, 1872; Coptocnemia Zell, 1872

= Hemeroplanis =

Genus of moths

Hemeroplanis is a genus of moths of the family Erebidae. The genus was erected by Jacob Hübner in 1818.

== Taxonomy ==
The genus has previously been classified in the subfamily Phytometrinae within Erebidae or in the subfamily Calpinae of the family Noctuidae.

== Species ==
- Hemeroplanis habitalis Walker, 1859 – black-dotted hemeroplanis moth
- Hemeroplanis historialis Grote, 1882 (syn: Hemeroplanis finitima J. B. Smith, 1893, Hemeroplanis secundalis J. B. Smith, 1907)
- Hemeroplanis immaculalis Harvey, 1875
- Hemeroplanis incusalis Grote, 1881
- Hemeroplanis obliqualis H. Edwards, 1886
- Hemeroplanis parallela J. B. Smith, 1907
- Hemeroplanis punitalis J. B. Smith, 1907
- Hemeroplanis rectalis (Smith, 1907)
- Hemeroplanis reversalis J. B. Smith, 1907
- Hemeroplanis scopulepes Haworth, 1809 – variable tropic moth
- Hemeroplanis trilineosa (Dyar, 1918)
