= Hemeroplanis parallela =

Scientific classification
- Domain: Eukaryota
- Kingdom: Animalia
- Phylum: Arthropoda
- Class: Insecta
- Order: Lepidoptera
- Superfamily: Noctuoidea
- Family: Erebidae
- Subfamily: Boletobiinae
- Genus: Hemeroplanis
- Species: H. parallela

Binomial name
- Hemeroplanis parallela (Smith, 1907)

Species of moth

Hemeroplanis parallela is a species of moth in the family Erebidae. It is found in North America.

The MONA or Hodges number for Hemeroplanis parallela is 8475.
