= Hemeroplanis punitalis =

Scientific classification
- Domain: Eukaryota
- Kingdom: Animalia
- Phylum: Arthropoda
- Class: Insecta
- Order: Lepidoptera
- Superfamily: Noctuoidea
- Family: Erebidae
- Subfamily: Boletobiinae
- Genus: Hemeroplanis
- Species: H. punitalis

Binomial name
- Hemeroplanis punitalis (Smith, 1907)

Species of moth

Hemeroplanis punitalis is a species of moth in the family Erebidae.

The MONA or Hodges number for Hemeroplanis punitalis is 8468.
