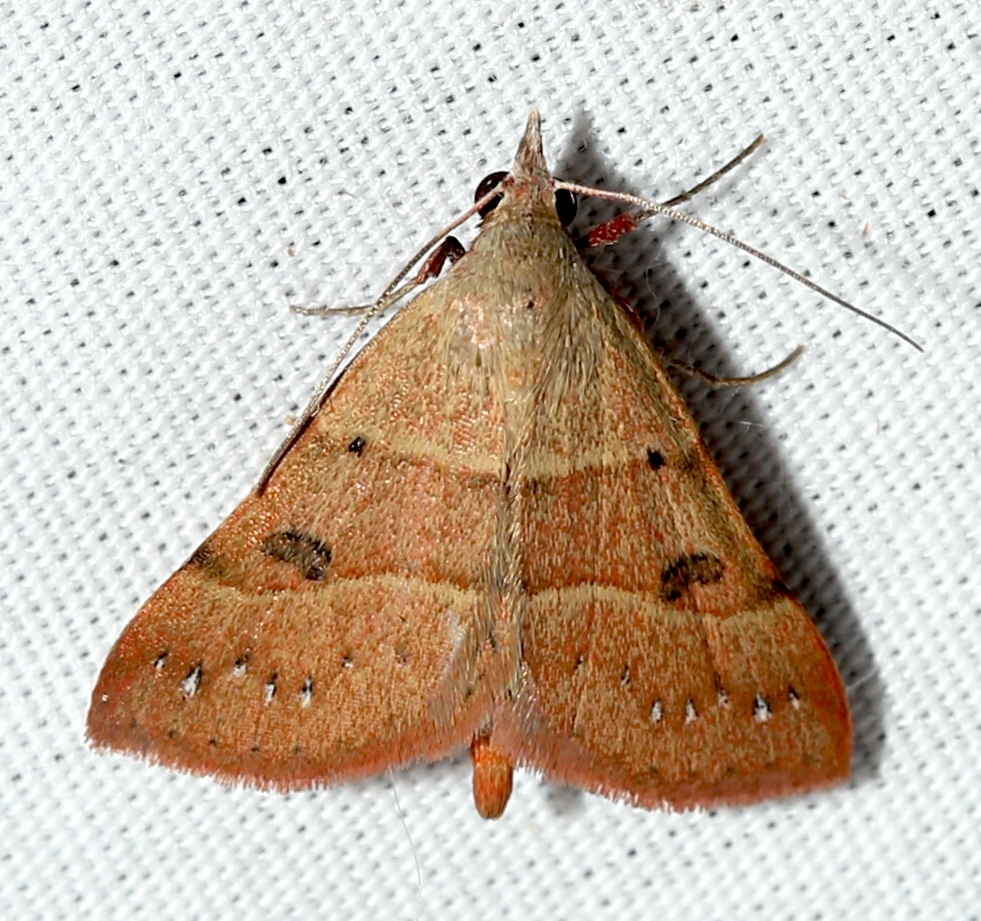

Scientific classification
- Kingdom: Animalia
- Phylum: Arthropoda
- Class: Insecta
- Order: Lepidoptera
- Superfamily: Noctuoidea
- Family: Erebidae
- Genus: Hemeroplanis
- Species: H. habitalis

Binomial name
- Hemeroplanis habitalis (Walker, 1859)

= Hemeroplanis habitalis =

Species of moth

Hemeroplanis habitalis, the black-dotted hemeroplanis, is a moth in the family Erebidae. The moth was erected by Francis Walker in 1859.

The MONA or Hodges number for Hemeroplanis habitalis is 8471.
