= Hemeroplanis immaculalis =

Scientific classification
- Domain: Eukaryota
- Kingdom: Animalia
- Phylum: Arthropoda
- Class: Insecta
- Order: Lepidoptera
- Superfamily: Noctuoidea
- Family: Erebidae
- Subfamily: Boletobiinae
- Genus: Hemeroplanis
- Species: H. immaculalis

Binomial name
- Hemeroplanis immaculalis (Harvey, 1875)

Species of moth

Hemeroplanis immaculalis is a species of moth in the family Erebidae.

The MONA or Hodges number for Hemeroplanis immaculalis is 8476.
