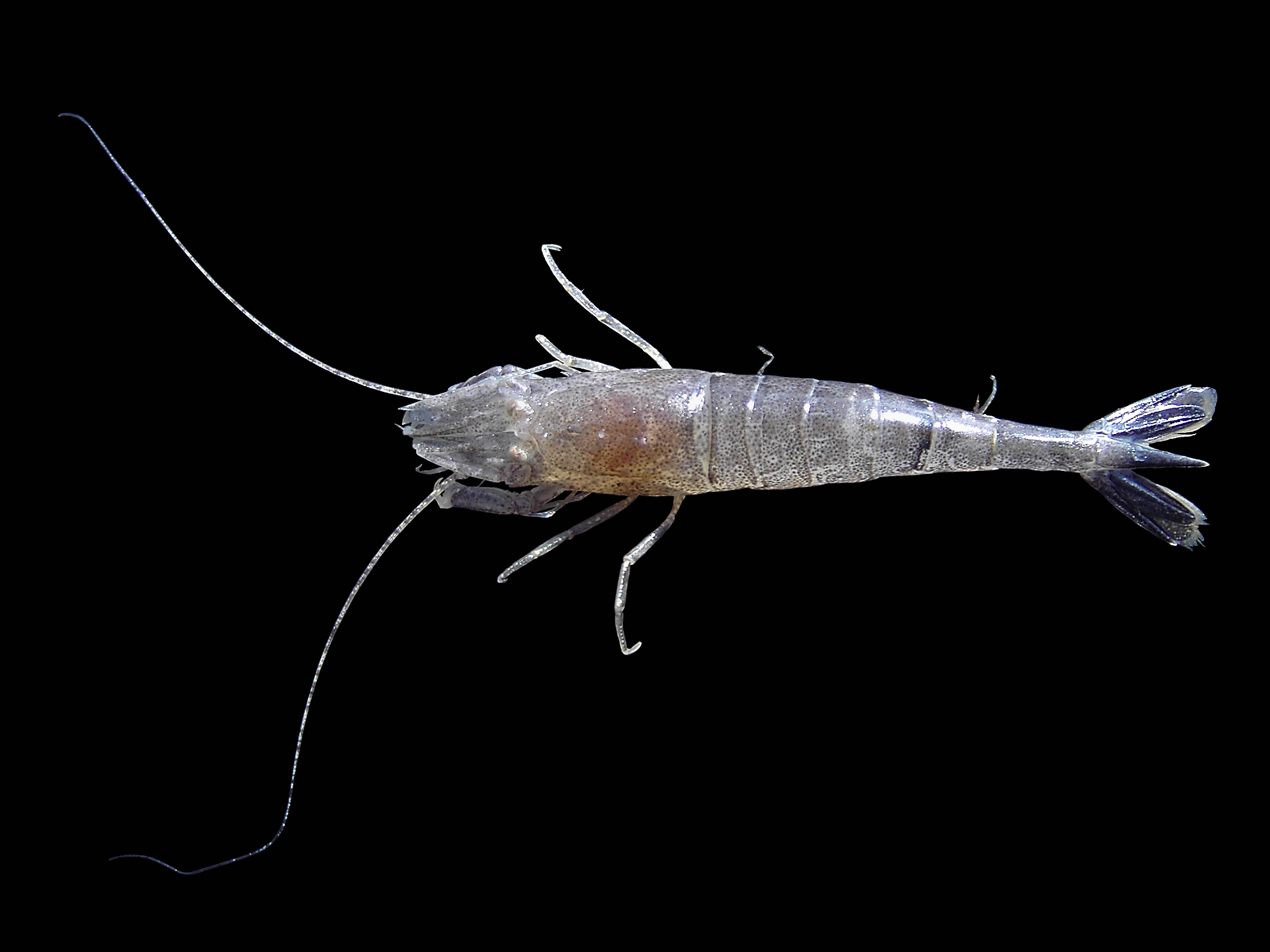
- Crangon crangon

Scientific classification
- Kingdom: Animalia
- Phylum: Arthropoda
- Class: Malacostraca
- Order: Decapoda
- Suborder: Pleocyemata
- Infraorder: Caridea
- Superfamily: Crangonoidea; Haworth, 1825

Families
- Crangonidae; Glyphocrangonidae

= Crangonoidea =

Superfamily of crustaceans

Crangonoidea is a superfamily of shrimp containing the two families Crangonidae and Glyphocrangonidae.
