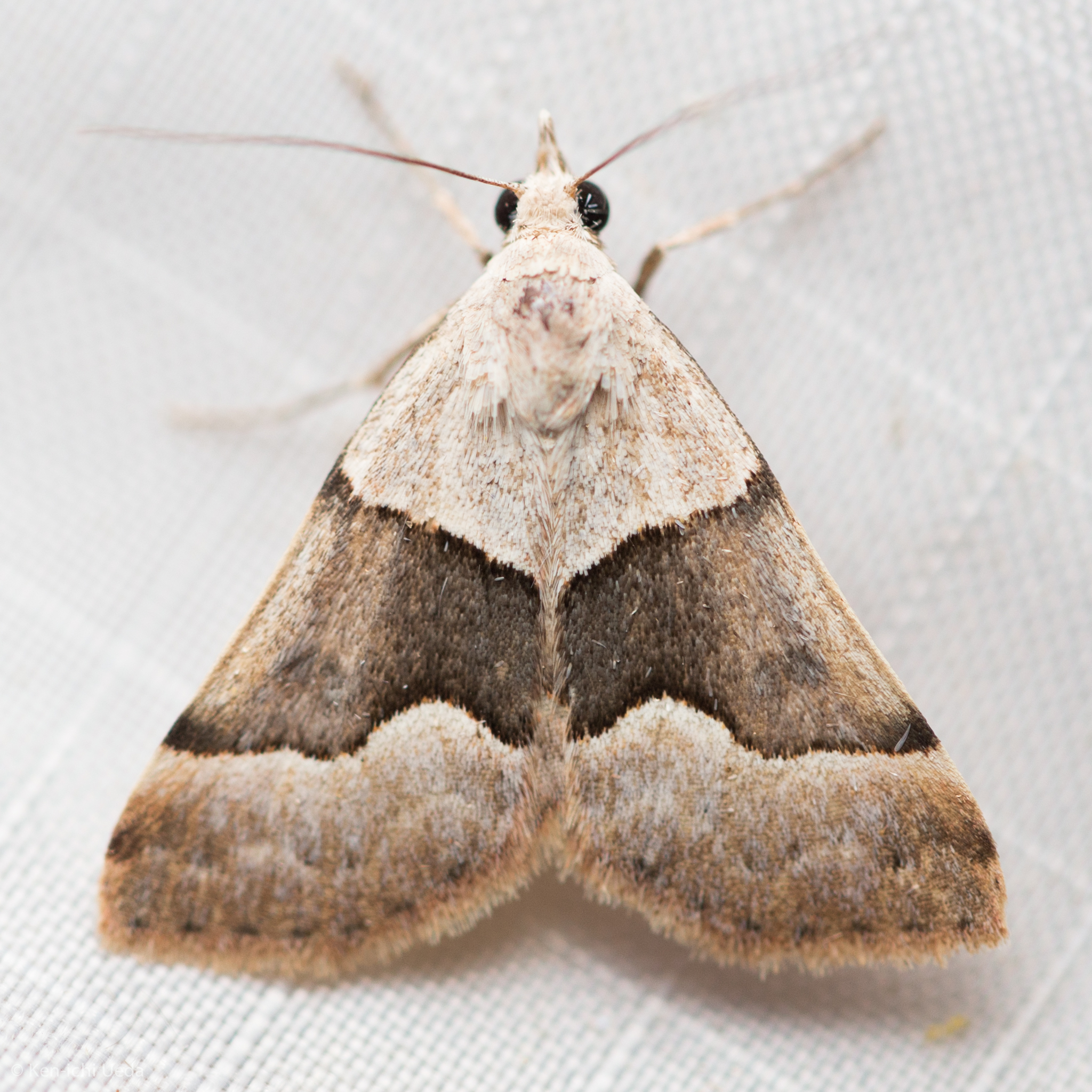

Scientific classification
- Kingdom: Animalia
- Phylum: Arthropoda
- Class: Insecta
- Order: Lepidoptera
- Superfamily: Noctuoidea
- Family: Erebidae
- Genus: Hemeroplanis
- Species: H. incusalis

Binomial name
- Hemeroplanis incusalis (Grote, 1881)

= Hemeroplanis incusalis =

Species of moth

Hemeroplanis incusalis is a species of moth in the family Erebidae.
