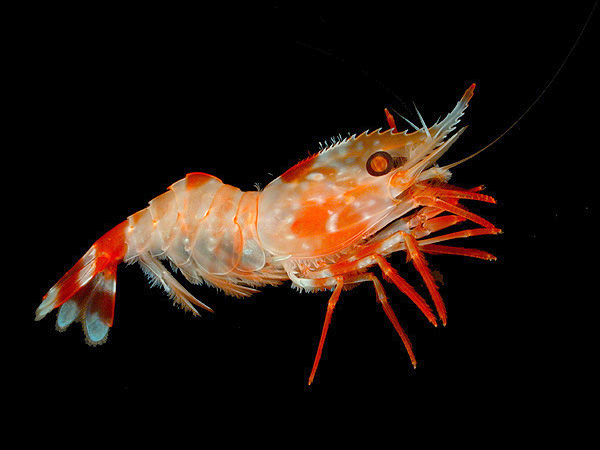
- Heterocarpus ensifer

Scientific classification
- Domain: Eukaryota
- Kingdom: Animalia
- Phylum: Arthropoda
- Class: Malacostraca
- Order: Decapoda
- Suborder: Pleocyemata
- Infraorder: Caridea
- Superfamily: Pandaloidea; Haworth, 1825

Families
- Pandalidae Haworth, 1825; Chlorotocellidae Komai, Chan & De Grave, 2019

= Pandaloidea =

Superfamily of crustaceans

The Pandaloidea are a superfamily of shrimp, comprising the large family Pandalidae (about 200 species) and the much smaller Chlorotocellidae (seven species).
