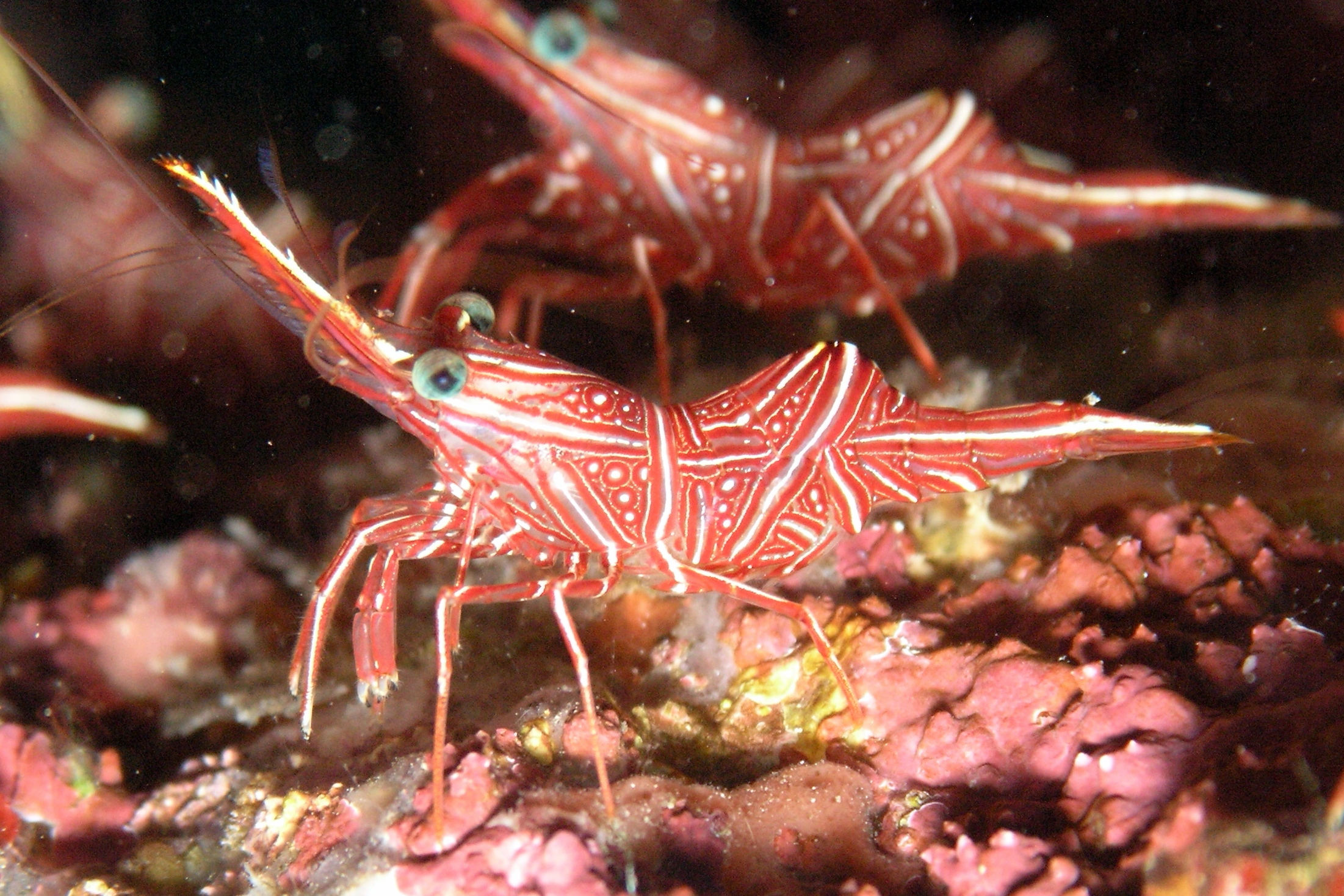
- Rhynchocinetes durbanensis

Scientific classification
- Kingdom: Animalia
- Phylum: Arthropoda
- Clade: Pancrustacea
- Class: Malacostraca
- Order: Decapoda
- Suborder: Pleocyemata
- Infraorder: Caridea
- Superfamily: Nematocarcinoidea; S. I. Smith, 1884

Families
- Eugonatonotidae; Lipkiidae; Nematocarcinidae; Rhynchocinetidae; Xiphocarididae

= Nematocarcinoidea =

Superfamily of crustaceans

Nematocarcinoidea is a superfamily of caridean shrimp, comprising five families – Eugonatonotidae, Lipkiidae, Nematocarcinidae, Rhynchocinetidae, and Xiphocarididae. Their shared feature is the presence of strap-like epipods on at least the first three pairs of pereiopods, and a blunt molar process.
