= Physetocaris =

Scientific classification
- Kingdom: Animalia
- Phylum: Arthropoda
- Clade: Pancrustacea
- Class: Malacostraca
- Order: Decapoda
- Suborder: Pleocyemata
- Infraorder: Caridea
- Superfamily: Physetocaridoidea; Chace, 1940
- Family: Physetocarididae; Chace, 1940
- Genus: Physetocaris; Chace, 1940
- Species: P. microphthalma

Binomial name
- Physetocaris microphthalma Chace, 1940

Species of Malacostraca

Physetocaris is a monotypic genus of caridean shrimp, containing a single species, Physetocaris microphthalma.

== Systematics ==
Physetocaris microphthalma was previously placed in its own family (Physetocarididae) and superfamily (Physetocaridoidea). Molecular phylogenetic analysis has revealed that the species actually belongs within the family (Pandalidae) and superfamily (Pandaloidea). The genus and species were described in 1940 by Fenner A. Chace Jr.

== Description ==
Adults have no eyes, and are missing the last segment of the first pereiopod, which is therefore unable to form a claw. They also have reduced gills and mouthparts, and no exopods on the pereiopods. The carapace is enlarged, and forms a tall rostrum.

== Distribution ==
P. microphthalma is rare, with only 35 specimens counted in a 1985 review. Although very poorly known, the distribution of Physetocaris appears to be very wide. In addition to specimens from both western and eastern parts of the Atlantic Ocean, it has been found in the southern Pacific Ocean.
