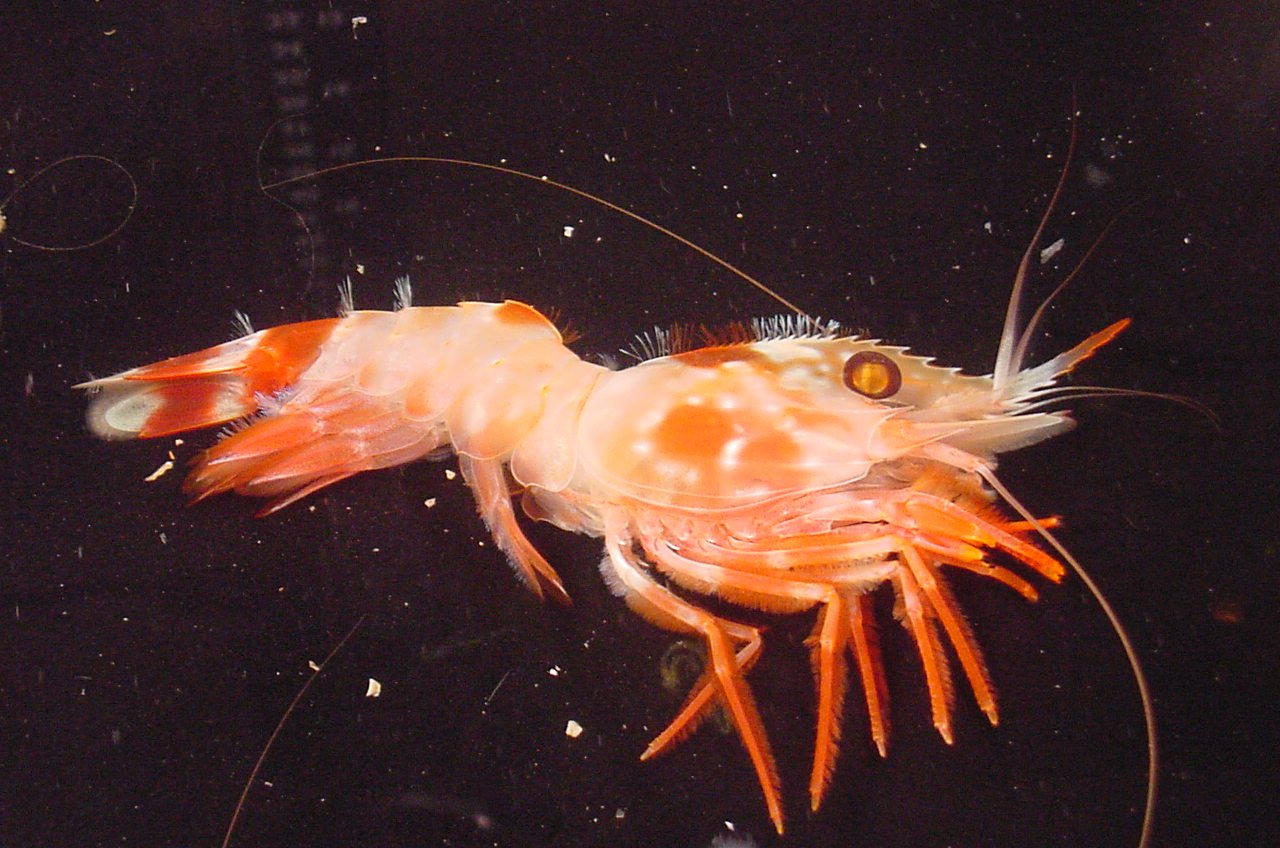
- Eugonatonotus crassus

Scientific classification
- Domain: Eukaryota
- Kingdom: Animalia
- Phylum: Arthropoda
- Class: Malacostraca
- Order: Decapoda
- Suborder: Pleocyemata
- Infraorder: Caridea
- Superfamily: Nematocarcinoidea
- Family: Eugonatonotidae; Chace, 1937
- Genus: Eugonatonotus; Schmitt, 1926

= Eugonatonotus =

Genus of crustaceans

Eugonatonotus is a genus of decapods and is the only genus in the monotypic family Eugonatonotidae.

The species of this genus are found in Central America, Southeastern Asia and Australia.

Species:

- Eugonatonotus chacei Chan & Yu, 1991
- Eugonatonotus crassus (A.Milne-Edwards, 1881)
