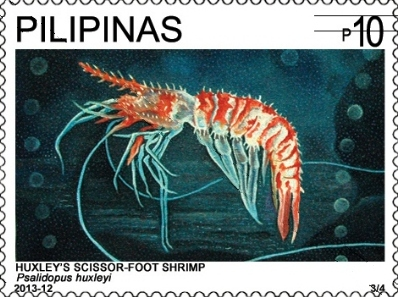
- Psalidopus huxleyi on a 2013 stamp of the Philippines

Scientific classification
- Domain: Eukaryota
- Kingdom: Animalia
- Phylum: Arthropoda
- Class: Malacostraca
- Order: Decapoda
- Suborder: Pleocyemata
- Infraorder: Caridea
- Superfamily: Psalidopodoidea; Wood-Mason, 1892
- Family: Psalidopodidae; Wood-Mason, 1892
- Genus: Psalidopus; Wood-Mason, 1892

Species
- Psalidopus barbouri Chace, 1939; Psalidopus huxleyi Wood-Mason & Alcock, 1892; Psalidopus tosaensis Toriyama & Hirokawa, 1993

= Psalidopus =

Genus of crustaceans

Psalidopus is a genus of shrimp placed in its own family, Psalidopodidae, and superfamily, Psalidopodoidea. It comprises three species, one in the western Atlantic Ocean, and two in the Indo-Pacific.

== Psalidopus barbouri ==
Psalidopus barbouri occurs on continental and insular slopes from Florida, the Bahamas and the Gulf of Mexico, to parts of the Caribbean Sea, perhaps extending as far south as Suriname. P. barbouri lives on steeply sloping soft muddy bottoms, sometimes mixed with sand, at depths of 400–800 m, where the temperature ranges from 6.1 to 10.0 °C (43.0 to 50.0 °F). Adults have a carapace length of 13–32 millimetres (0.51–1.26 in), with the total length of the animal, from the tip of the rostrum to the tip of the tail, being up to 5.5 times longer than the carapace.

== Psalidopus huxleyi ==
Psalidopus huxleyi occurs on continental and insular slopes across the Indian Ocean, including the Laccadive Sea, off southern India, the Andaman Sea and the Timor Sea, as well as in the western Pacific Ocean from southern Japan to the Philippines, the Sulu Sea, and the Celebes Sea. P. huxleyi lives on steeply sloping bottoms of various compositions and consistencies, at depths of 500–100 m, where the temperature ranges from 5.9 to 13.6 °C (42.6 to 56.5 °F). The carapace is 10–30 mm (0.39–1.18 in) long.

== Psalidopus tosaensis ==
Psalidopus tosaensis lives at greater depth (c. 2800 m) and lower temperature – 1.6 °C (34.9 °F) – than either of the other species of Psalidopus. Although it is geographically closer to P. huxleyi, it appears to be more closely related to P. barbouri.
