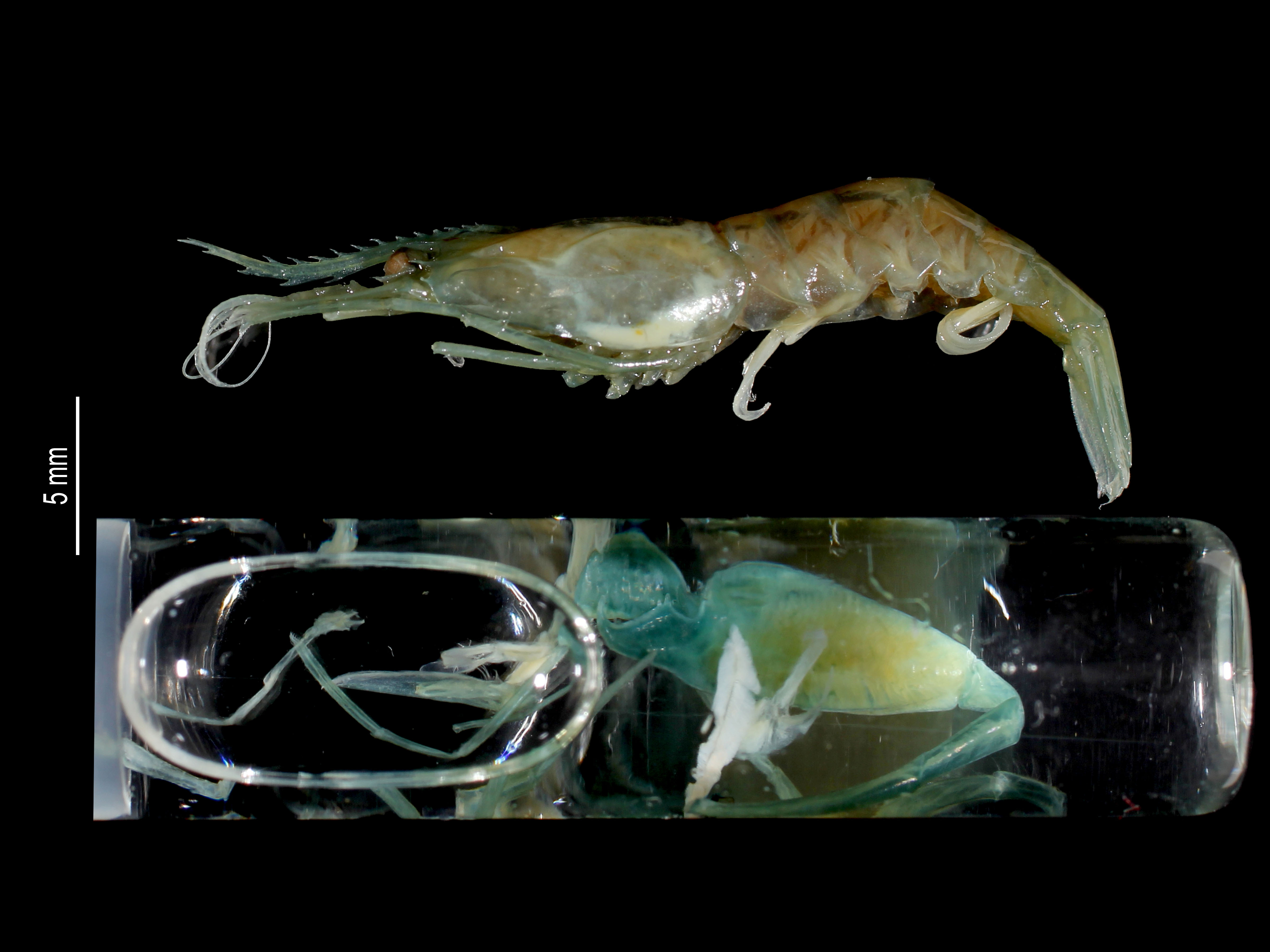
- Bathypalaemonella adenensis

Scientific classification
- Kingdom: Animalia
- Phylum: Arthropoda
- Class: Malacostraca
- Order: Decapoda
- Suborder: Pleocyemata
- Infraorder: Caridea
- Superfamily: Campylonotoidea; Sollaud, 1913

Families
- Campylonotidae; Bathypalaemonellidae

= Campylonotoidea =

Superfamily of crustaceans

Campylonotoidea is a superfamily of shrimp, containing the two families Campylonotidae and Bathypalaemonellidae. Fenner A. Chace considered it to be the sister group to the much larger superfamily Palaemonoidea, with which it shares the absence of endopods on the pereiopods, and the fact that the first pereiopod is thinner than the second. Using molecular phylogenetics, Bracken et al. proposed that Campylonotoidea may be closer to Atyoidea. There are sixteen described species in 3 genera; no fossils are known.

- Campylonotidae Sollaud, 1913
  - Campylonotus Bate, 1888
- Bathypalaemonellidae de Saint Laurent, 1985
  - Bathypalaemonella Balss, 1914
  - Bathypalaemonetes Cleva, 2001
