= Hemeroplanis historialis =

Scientific classification
- Kingdom: Animalia
- Phylum: Arthropoda
- Class: Insecta
- Order: Lepidoptera
- Superfamily: Noctuoidea
- Family: Erebidae
- Genus: Hemeroplanis
- Species: H. historialis

Binomial name
- Hemeroplanis historialis (Grote, 1882)

Synonyms
- Hemeroplanis finitima (Smith, 1893); Hemeroplanis secundalis (Smith, 1907)

Species of moth

Hemeroplanis historialis is a species of moth in the family Erebidae.

The MONA or Hodges number for Hemeroplanis historialis is 8472.
