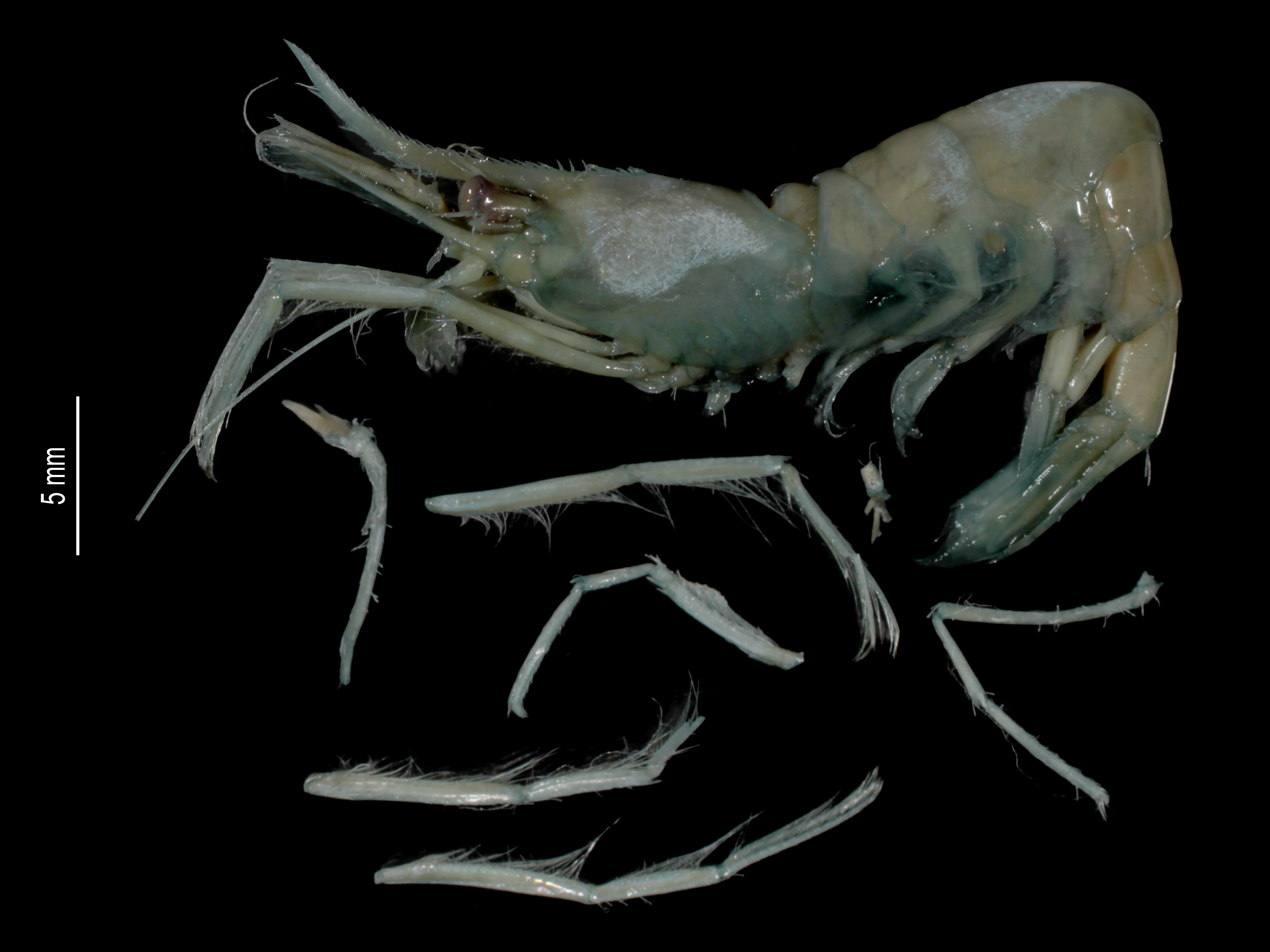
- Parastylodactylus semblatae

Scientific classification
- Kingdom: Animalia
- Phylum: Arthropoda
- Clade: Pancrustacea
- Class: Malacostraca
- Order: Decapoda
- Suborder: Pleocyemata
- Infraorder: Caridea
- Superfamily: Stylodactyloidea; Bate, 1888
- Family: Stylodactylidae; Bate, 1888

Genera
- Bathystylodactylus; Neostylodactylus; Parastylodactylus; Stylodactyloides; Stylodactylus

= Stylodactylidae =

Family of crustaceans

The family Stylodactylidae is a group of shrimp and the only representative of the superfamily Stylodactyloidea. It contains the five genera: Bathystylodactylus, Neostylodactylus, Parastylodactylus, Stylodactyloides and Stylodactylus.
