= Adrian Hardy Haworth =

English entomologist, botanist and carcinologist (1767–1833)

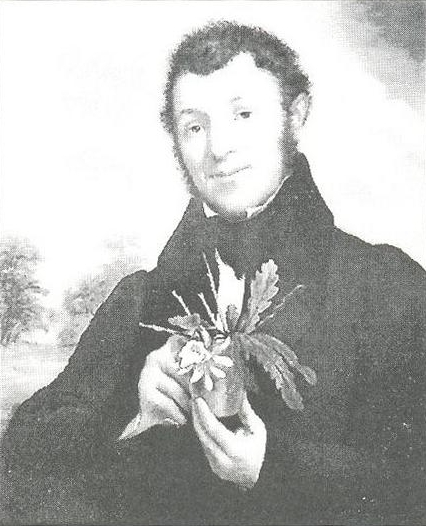
- Born: 19 April 1767; Kingston upon Hull
- Died: 24 August 1833 (aged 66); Little Chelsea, London
- Citizenship: British
- Known for: Lepidoptera Britannica
- Scientific career
- Fields: Entomology, botany and carcinology
- Workplaces: Göttingen University (Hon. DSc)
- Author abbrev. (botany): Haw.

Adrian Hardy Haworth (19 April 1767 – 24 August 1833) was an English entomologist, botanist and carcinologist.

== Family ==
The younger son of Benjamin Haworth, of Haworth Hall and Anne Booth, he was educated at Hull Grammar School and by tutors who steered him towards a career in the law. After inheriting the family estate, he devoted all his time to natural history.

He married three times, firstly in 1792 to Elizabeth Sidney Cumbrey (died 1803), secondly in 1805 to Amy Baines (died 1813), and lastly in 1819 to Elizabeth Maria Coombs, who survived him. By his first wife, he left children from whom descend the Haworth-Booths.

== Career ==
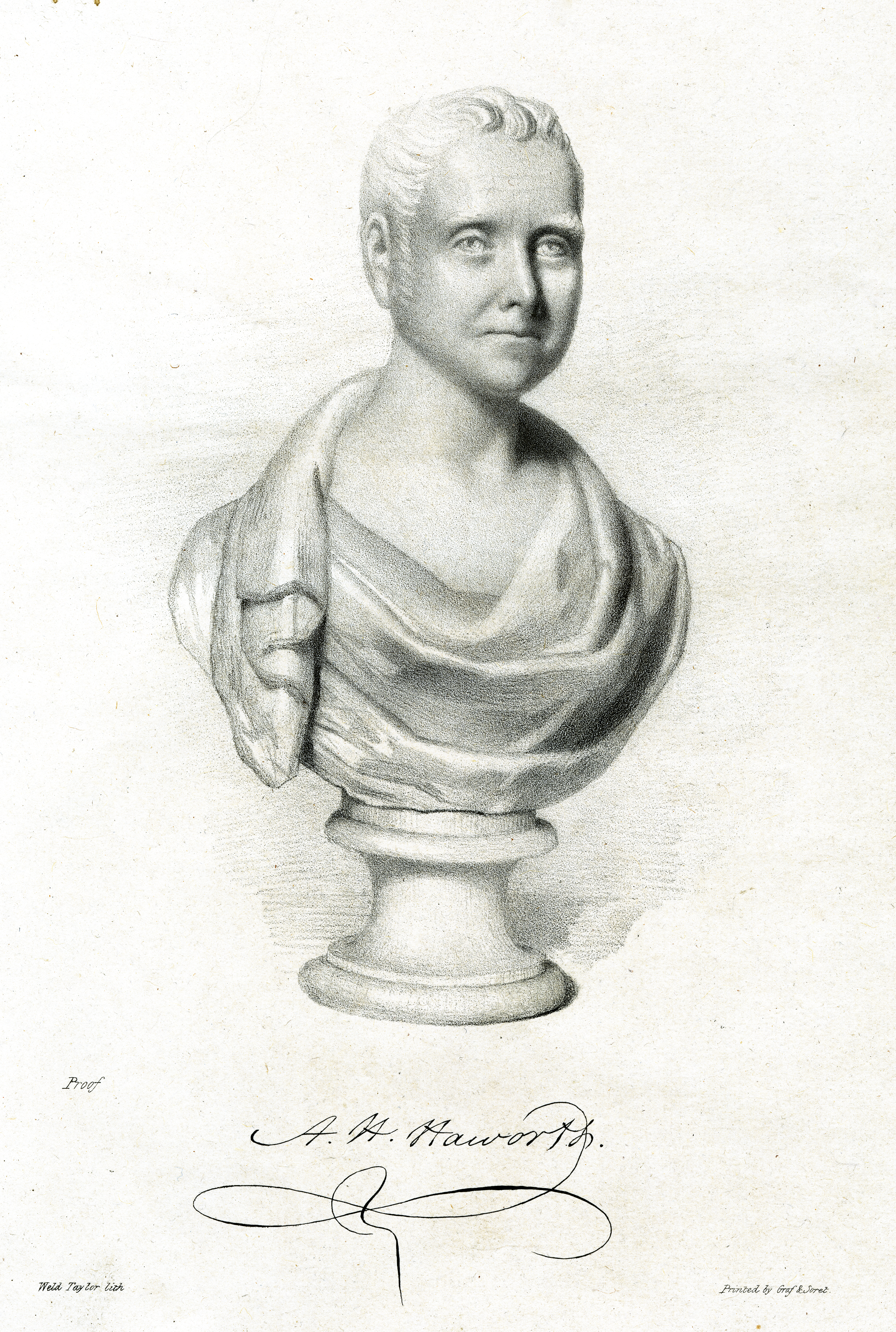
A lithograph of a bust design by Weld Taylor

In 1792 he settled in Little Chelsea, London, where he met William Jones (1750–1818) who was to have a great influence on him. He became a Fellow of the Linnean Society of London in 1798. His research work was aided by his use of the library and herbarium of his friend Sir Joseph Banks (1743–1820) and regular visits to the Royal Botanic Gardens, Kew.

His Yorkshire estate is now represented by Haworth Hall, in Beverley Road, Hull.

He was the author of Lepidoptera Britannica (1803–1828), the most authoritative work on British butterflies and moths until Henry Tibbats Stainton's Manual in 1857. He was also a carcinologist, specialising in shrimp. He is responsible for the names of several taxa, including:

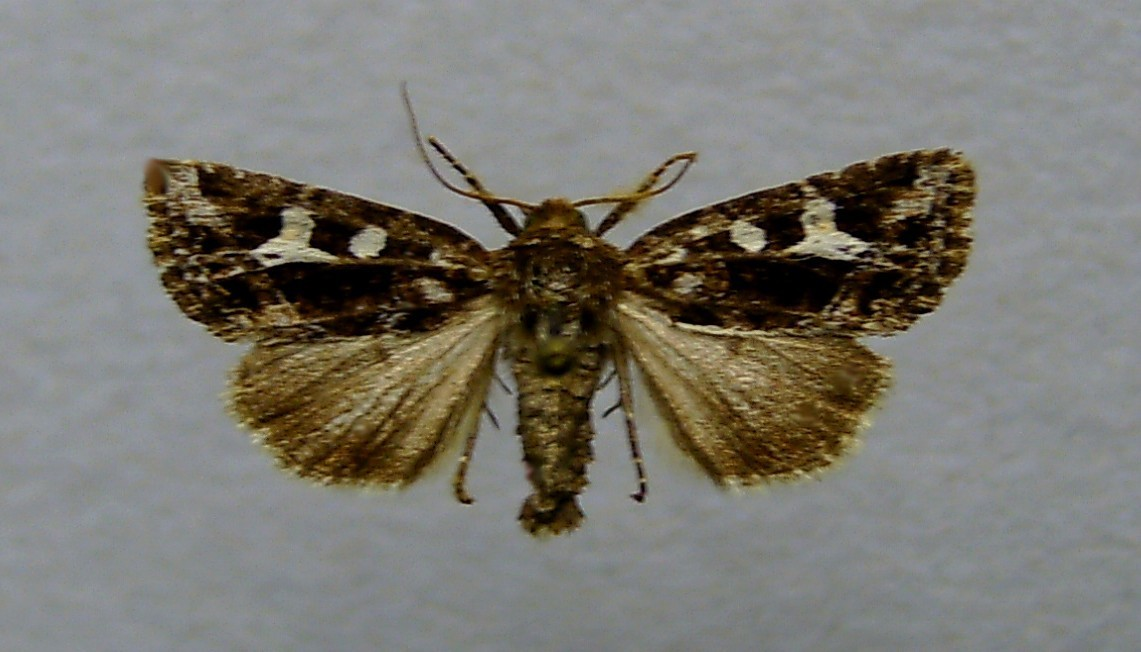
Celaena haworthii

- Order Mysida Haworth, 1825
- Family Mysidae Haworth, 1825
- Superfamily Pandaloidea Haworth, 1825
- Family Pandalidae Haworth, 1825
- Superfamily Crangonoidea Haworth, 1825
- Family Crangonidae Haworth, 1825
- Family Porcellanidae Haworth, 1825

and named 22 new genera of moths.

The British entomologist John Curtis named a moth of the family Noctuidae 1829 in honour of Adrian Hardy Haworth Celaena haworthii.

In 1812 he wrote the first paper in Volume 1 of the Transactions of the Entomological Society of London, a review of previous work on British insects. In 1833, he lent support to the founding of what became the Royal Entomological Society of London having been President of its predecessor. He was a Fellow of the Horticultural Society and a Fellow of the Linnean Society.

His botanical contributions included the first monograph on the genus Crocus (1809). The plant genus Haworthia is named after Adrian Hardy Haworth.

== Works ==
- Synopsis Plantarum Succulentarum (London, 1812)
- Saxifragearum enumeratio (London, 1821)
- Lepidoptera Britannica (1803–1828)
- Observations on the Genus Mesembryanthemum (London, 1794)

== Bibliography ==
- Haworth, Adrian (1820). "On the Cultivation of Crocuses, with a short Account of the different Species known at present. February 7, 1809". Transactions of the Horticultural Society of London. 1. M. Bulmer & Co.: 122–139.
