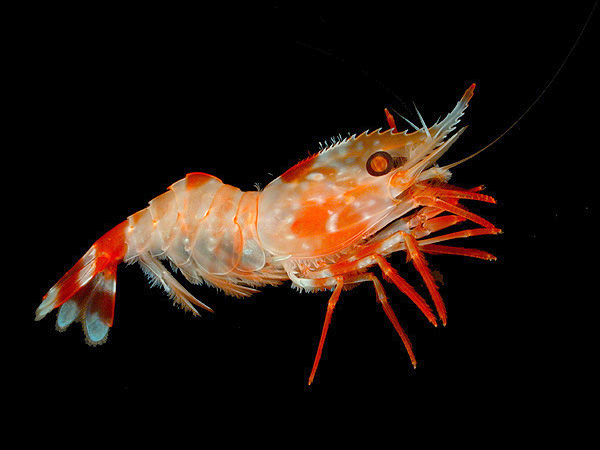
- Heterocarpus ensifer

Scientific classification
- Kingdom: Animalia
- Phylum: Arthropoda
- Clade: Pancrustacea
- Class: Malacostraca
- Order: Decapoda
- Suborder: Pleocyemata
- Infraorder: Caridea; Dana, 1852

Superfamilies
- Alpheoidea; Atyoidea; Bresilioidea; Campylonotoidea; Crangonoidea; Galatheacaridoidea; Nematocarcinoidea; Oplophoroidea; Palaemonoidea; Pandaloidea; Pasiphaeoidea; Physetocaridoidea; Processoidea; Psalidopodoidea; Stylodactyloidea

Synonyms
- List: Amphionidacea; Amphionidea; Eukyphida

= Caridea =

Caridea Temporal range: Lower Jurassic – present

Infraorder of crustacean; "true" shrimp

The Caridea, commonly known as caridean shrimp or true shrimp (from Ancient Greek καρίς, καρίδος (karís, karídos, "shrimp"), are an infraorder of shrimp within the order Decapoda. This infraorder contains all species of true shrimp. They are found widely around the world in both fresh and salt water. Many other animals with similar names – such as the mud shrimp of Axiidea and the boxer shrimp of Stenopodidea – are not true shrimp, but many have evolved features similar to true shrimp.

== Biology ==
Carideans are found in every kind of aquatic habitat, with the majority of species being marine. Around a quarter of the described species are found in fresh water, however, including almost all the members of the species-rich family Atyidae and the Palaemonidae subfamily Palaemoninae. They include several commercially important species, such as Macrobrachium rosenbergii, and are found on every continent except Antarctica. The marine species are found at depths to 5,000 m (16,000 ft), and from the tropics to the polar regions.

In addition to the great variety in habitat, carideans vary greatly in form, from species a few millimetres long when fully grown, to those that grow to over 300 mm (1 ft) long. Except where secondarily lost, shrimp have one pair of stalked eyes, although they are sometimes covered by the carapace, which protects the cephalothorax. The carapace also surrounds the gills, through which water is pumped by the action of the mouthparts.

Most carideans are omnivorous, but some are specialised for particular modes of feeding. Some are filter feeders, using their setose (bristly) legs as a sieve; some scrape algae from rocks. The snapping shrimp of the genus Alpheus snap their claws to create a shock wave that stuns prey. Many cleaner shrimp, which groom reef fish and feed on their parasites and necrotic tissue, are carideans. In turn, carideans are eaten by various animals, particularly fish and seabirds, and frequently host bopyrid parasites.

=== Lifecycle ===
Unlike Dendrobranchiates, Carideans brood their eggs rather than releasing them into the water. Caridean larvae undergo all naupliar development within the egg, and eclose as a zoea. The zoea stage feeds on phytoplankton. There can be as few as two zoea stages, (e.g. some freshwater Palaemonidae), or as many as 13, (e.g. some Pandalidae). The post-zoeal larva, often called a decapodid, resembles a miniature adult, but retains some larval characteristics. The decapodid larva will metamorphose a final time into a post-larval juvenile: a young shrimp having all the characteristics of adults. Most adult carideans are benthic animals living primarily on the sea floor.

Common species include Pandalus borealis (the "pink shrimp"), Crangon crangon (the "brown shrimp") and the snapping shrimp of the genus Alpheus. Depending on the species and location, they grow from about 1.2 to 30 cm (1/2 to 11 3/4 in) long, and live between 1.0 and 6.5 years.

== Commercial fishing ==
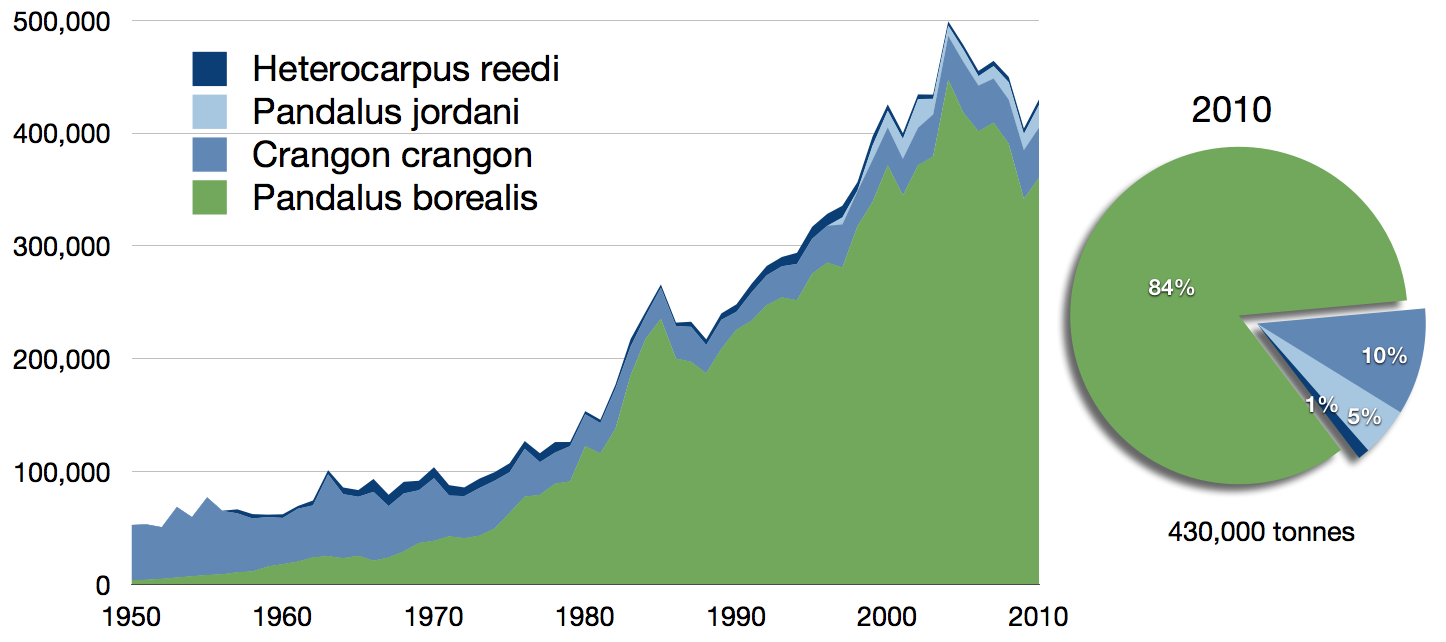
Global wild capture, 1950–2010, in tonnes, of caridean shrimp

The most significant commercial species among the carideans is Pandalus borealis, followed by Crangon crangon. The wild-capture production of P. borealis is about ten times that of C. crangon. In 1950, the position was reversed, with the capture of C. crangon about ten times that of P. borealis.

In 2010, the global aquaculture of all shrimp and prawn species (3.5 million tonnes) slightly exceeded the global wild capture (3.2 million tonnes). No carideans were significantly involved in aquaculture, but about 430,000 tonnes were captured in the wild. That is, about 13% of the global wild capture, or about 6% of the total production of all shrimp and prawns, were carideans.

== Systematics and related taxa ==
Difference between carideans and dendrobranchiates

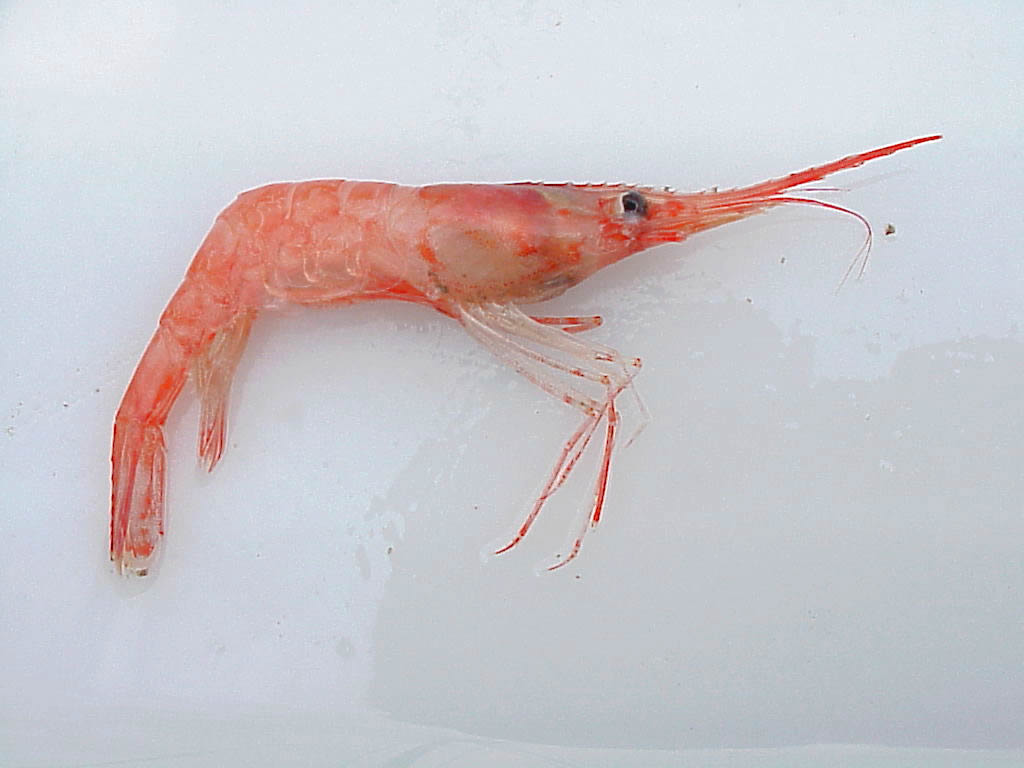
Carideans, such as Pandalus borealis, typically have two pairs of claws, and the second segment of the abdomen overlaps the segments on either side. The abdomen shows a pronounced caridean bend.

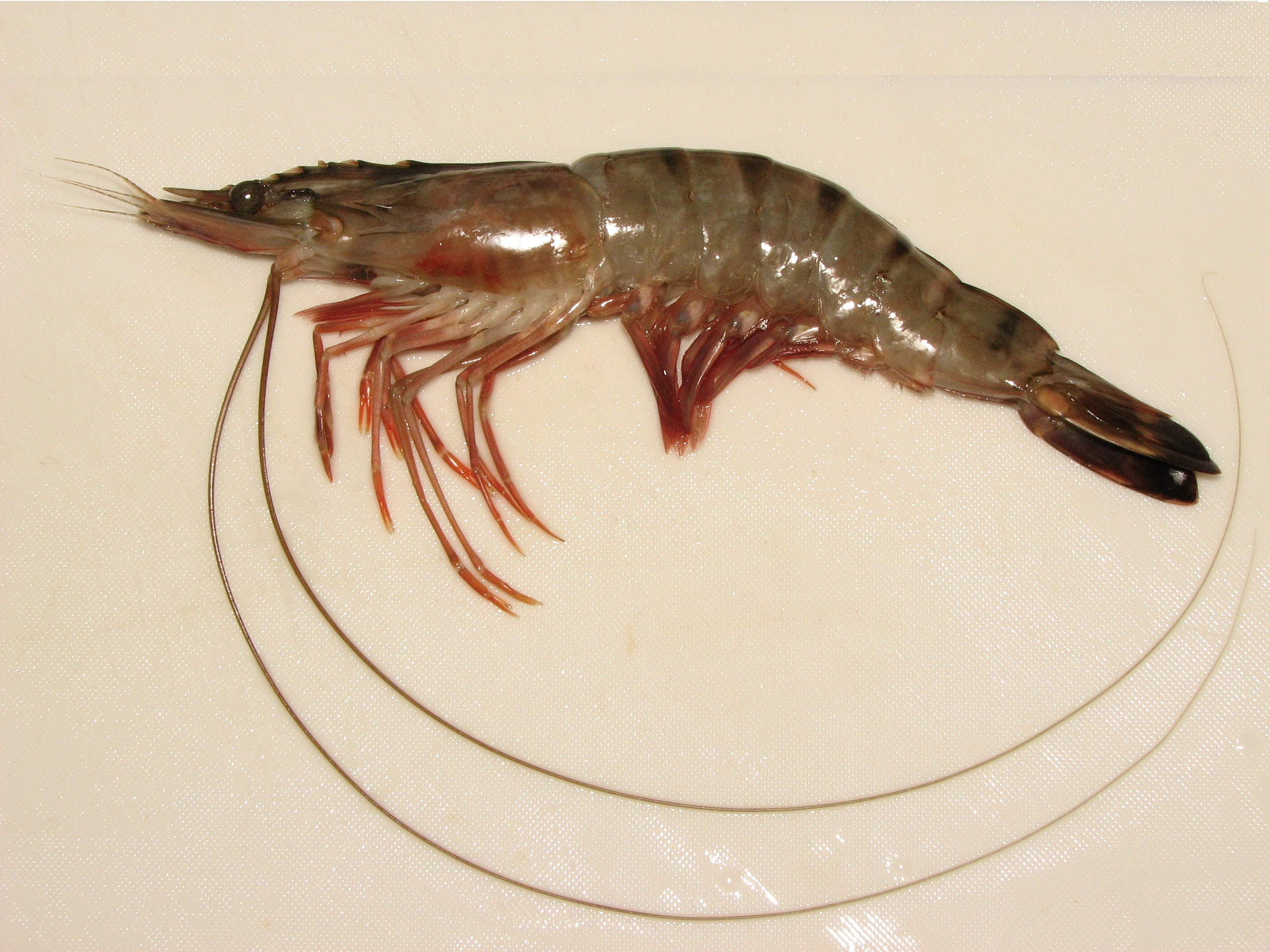
Dendrobranchiata, such as Penaeus monodon, typically have three pairs of claws, and even-sized segments on the abdomen. There is no pronounced bend in the abdomen.

Shrimp of the infraorder Caridea are more closely related to lobsters and crabs than they are to the members of the sub-order Dendrobranchiata (prawns). Biologists distinguish these two groups based on differences in their gill structures. The gill structure is lamellar in carideans but branching in dendrobranchiates. The easiest practical way to separate true shrimp from dendrobranchiates is to examine the second abdominal segment. The second segment of a carideans overlaps both the first and the third segment, while the second segment of a dendrobranchiate overlaps only the third segment. They also differ in that carideans typically have two pairs of chelae (claws), while dendrobranchiates have three. A third group, the Stenopodidea, contains around 70 species and differs from the other groups in that the third pair of legs is greatly enlarged.

Procarididea are the sister group to the Caridea, comprising only eleven species.

The cladogram below shows Caridea's relationships to other relatives within Decapoda, from analysis by Wolfe et al., 2019.

- Decapoda
  - - Dendrobranchiata (prawns)
  - Pleocyemata
    - - Stenopodidea (boxer shrimp)
      - - Procarididea
        - Caridea ("true" shrimp)
    - Reptantia (crawling / walking decapods)
      - - Achelata (spiny lobsters and slipper lobsters)
        - - Polychelida (benthic crustaceans)
          - Glypheidea (glypheoid lobsters)
          - Astacidea (lobsters and crayfish)
      - - Axiidea (mud shrimp, ghost shrimp, and burrowing shrimp)
        - - Gebiidea (mud lobsters and mud shrimp)
          - - Anomura (hermit crabs and allies)
            - Brachyura ("true" crabs)

The below cladogram shows the internal relationships of eight selected families within Caridea, with the Atyidae (freshwater shrimp) being the most basal:

- Caridea
  - Atyidae
  - - Oplophoridae
    - - - Lysmatidae
        - Barbouriidae
      - - - Thoridae
          - Hippolytidae
        - - Alpheidae
          - Palaemonidae

== Taxonomy ==
The infraorder Caridea is divided into 15 superfamilies:

Superfamily	Image	Description
Alpheoidea	Lysmata amboinensis	Contains four families, including Alpheidae, the family of pistol or snapping shrimp, and Hippolytidae a family of cleaner shrimp.
Atyoidea	Atya gabonensis	Contains one family, Atyidae, with 42 genera. They are present in all tropical and most temperate waters. Adults of this family are almost always confined to fresh water.
Bresilioidea	Rimicaris kairei	Likely to be an artificial group, containing five families which may or may not be related.
Campylonotoidea		Contains two families. Fenner Chace considered it to be a sister group to the much larger superfamily Palaemonoidea (below) with which it shares the absence of endopods on the pereiopods, and a first pereiopod that is thinner than the second. Using molecular phylogenetics, Bracken et al. proposed that Campylonotoidea may be closer to Atyoidea (above).
Crangonoidea	Crangon crangon	Contains two families: including the family Crangonidae. Crangon crangon is abundant around the European coast has a sandy brown colour which it can change to match its environment. It lives in shallow water which can be slightly brackish, and it feeds nocturnally. During the day, it stays buried in the sand to escape predatory birds and fish, with only its antennae protruding.
Galatheacaridoidea		Contains only one species, the rare Galatheacaris abyssalis. Described in 1997 on the basis of what was then a single specimen, it was seen to be so different from previously known shrimp species that a new family Galatheacarididae and superfamily Galatheacaridoidea were erected for it. Molecular phylogenetic analyses has indicated that Galatheacaris abyssalis is the larval stage of Eugonatonotus.
Nematocarcinoidea	Rhynchocinetes durbanensis	Contains four families. They share the presence of strap-like epipods on at least the first three pairs of pereiopods, and a blunt molar process. One of the families, Rhynchocinetidae, are a group of small, reclusive red-and-white shrimp. This family typically has an upward-hinged foldable rostrum, hence its taxon name "Rhynchocinetidae", which means "movable beak". Pictured is Rhynchocinetes durbanensis.
Oplophoroidea	Hymenodora glacialis	There is only one family, Oplophoridae, of this pelagic shrimp, which contains 12 genera.
Palaemonoidea	Palaemon elegans	Contains 8 families and nearly 1,000 species. The position of the family Typhlocarididae is unclear, although the monophyly of a group containing the remaining seven families is well supported.
Pandaloidea	Heterocarpus ensifer	Contains two families. The larger family Pandalidae has 23 genera and about 200 species, including some of commercial significance.
Pasiphaeoidea		Contains one family with seven extant genera.
Physetocaridoidea		Contains a single family with only one rare species, Physetocaris microphthalma. Adult Physetocaris microphthalma have no eyes, and cannot form a claw because they are missing the last segment of the first pereiopod. They also have reduced gills and mouthparts, and no exopods on the pereiopods.
Processoidea		Contains a single family comprising 65 species in 5 genera. These small nocturnal shrimp live mostly in shallow seas, particularly on grass flats. The first pereiopods are usually asymmetrical, with a claw on one but not the other. The rostrum is generally a simple projection from the front of the carapace, with two teeth, one at the tip, and one further back.
Psalidopodoidea	Psalidopus huxleyi	Contains a single family comprising three species, one in the western Atlantic Ocean, and two in the Indo-Pacific.
Stylodactyloidea		Contains a single family made up of five genera.

== Fossil record ==
The fossil record of the Caridean is sparse, with only 57 exclusively fossil species known. The earliest of these cannot be assigned to any family, but date from the Lower Jurassic and Cretaceous. A number of extinct genera cannot be placed in any superfamily:

- Acanthinopus Pinna, 1974
- Alcmonacaris Polz, 2009
- Bannikovia Garassino & Teruzzi, 1996
- Blaculla Münster, 1839
- Buergerocaris Schweigert & Garassino, 2004
- Gampsurus von der Marck, 1863
- Hefriga Münster, 1839
- Leiothorax Pinna, 1974
- Parvocaris Bravi & Garassino, 1998
- Pinnacaris Garassino & Teruzzi, 1993

== See also ==
- Dendrobranchiata
