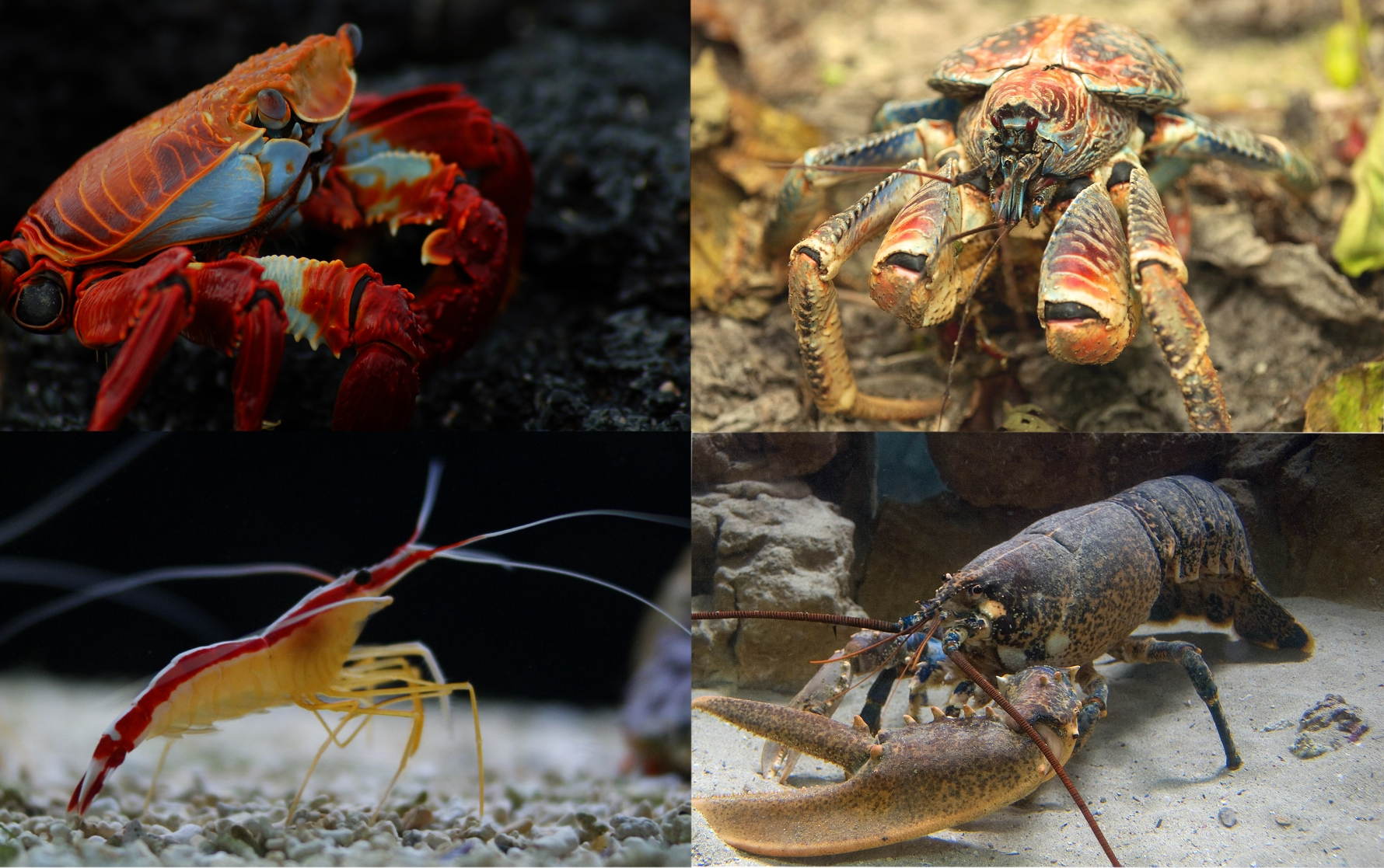
- From left to right: Grapsus grapsus (Brachyura), Coconut crab (Anomura), Lysmata amboinensis (Caridea), Homarus gammarus (Astacidea).

Scientific classification
- Kingdom: Animalia
- Phylum: Arthropoda
- Clade: Pancrustacea
- Class: Malacostraca
- Superorder: Eucarida
- Order: Decapoda; Latreille, 1802

Suborders
- Dendrobranchiata; Pleocyemata; See text for superfamilies.

= Decapod =

Decapoda Temporal range: Devonian–recent

Order of crustaceans

A decapod is a crustacean in the large order of Decapoda (from Ancient Greek δέκά déka 'ten' + πούς poús 'foot') within the class Malacostraca, including crabs, lobsters, crayfish, shrimp, and prawns. Most decapods are scavengers. The order is estimated to contain nearly 15,000 extant species in around 2,700 genera, with around 3,300 fossil species. Nearly half of these species are crabs, with the shrimp (about 3,000 species) and Anomura including hermit crabs, king crabs, porcelain crabs, squat lobsters (about 2500 species) making up the bulk of the remainder. The earliest fossils of the group date to the Devonian.

== Anatomy ==
Decapods can have as many as 38 appendages, arranged in one pair per body segment. As the name Decapoda (from the Greek δέκα, deca-, "ten", and πούς / ποδός, -pod, "foot") implies, ten of these appendages are considered legs. They are the pereiopods, found on the last five thoracic segments. In many decapods, one pair of these "legs" has enlarged pincers, called chelae, with the legs being called chelipeds. In front of the pereiopods are three pairs of maxillipeds that function as feeding appendages. The head has five pairs of appendages, including mouthparts, antennae, and antennules. There are five more pairs of appendages on the abdomen. They are called pleopods. There is one final pair called uropods, which, with the telson, form the tail fan.

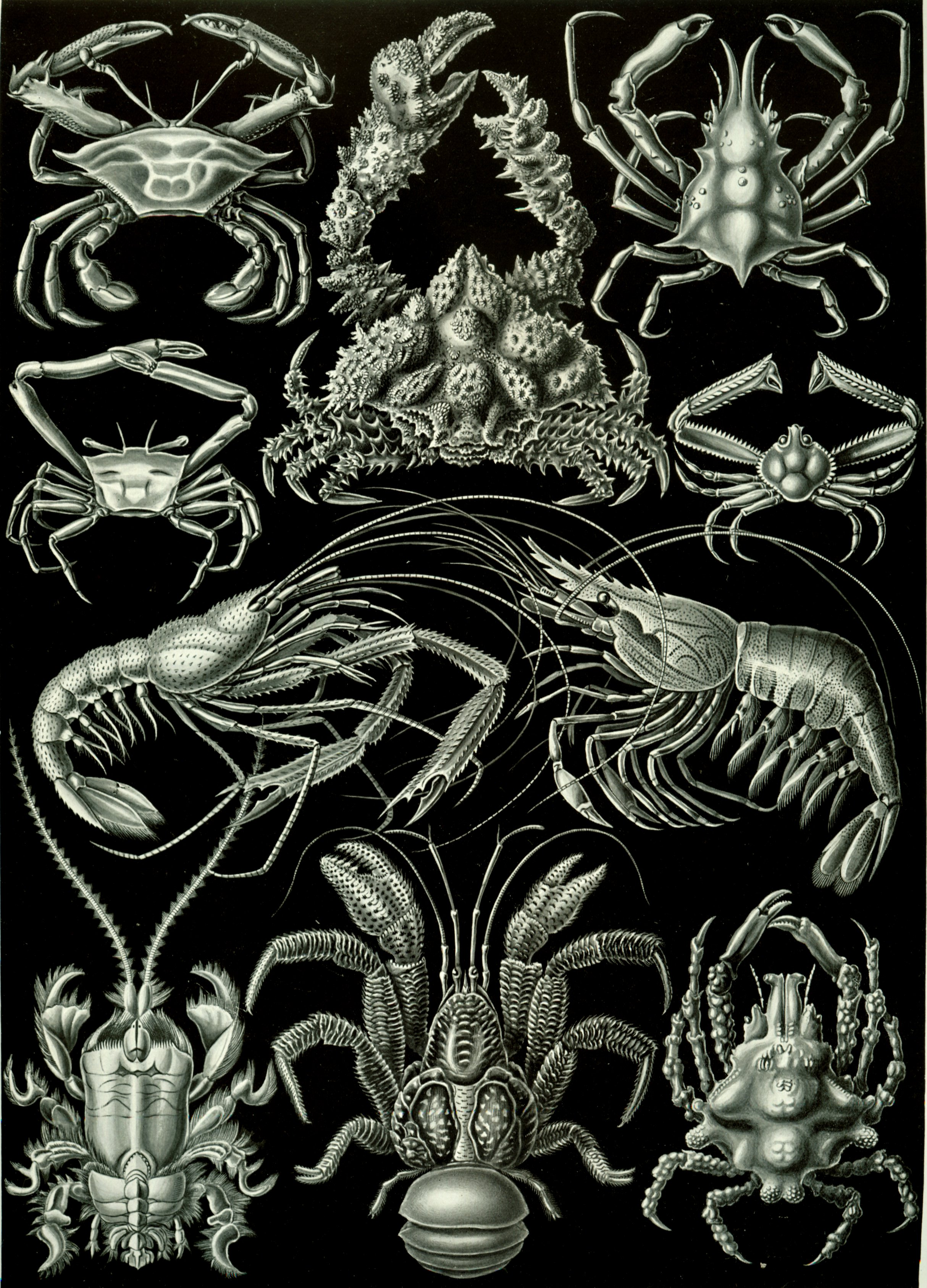
"Decapoda" from Ernst Haeckel's Kunstformen der Natur, 1904

== Evolution ==
A 2019 molecular clock analysis suggested decapods originated in the Late Ordovician around 455 million years ago, with the Dendrobranchiata (prawns) being the first group to diverge. The remaining group, called Pleocyemata, then diverged between the swimming shrimp groupings and the crawling/walking group called Reptantia, consisting of lobsters and crabs. High species diversification can be traced to the Jurassic and Cretaceous periods, which coincides with the rise and spread of modern coral reefs, a key habitat for the decapods. Despite the inferred early origin, the oldest fossils of the group such as Palaeopalaemon only date to the Late Devonian.

The cladogram below shows the internal relationships of Decapoda, from analysis by Wolfe et al. (2019).

- Decapoda
  - - Dendrobranchiata (prawns)
  - Pleocyemata
    - - Stenopodidea (boxer shrimp)
      - - Procarididea
        - Caridea ("true" shrimp)
    - Reptantia (crawling / walking decapods)
      - - Achelata (spiny lobsters and slipper lobsters)
        - - Polychelida (benthic crustaceans)
          - Glypheidea (glypheoid lobsters)
          - Astacidea (lobsters and crayfish)
      - - Axiidea (mud shrimp, ghost shrimp, and burrowing shrimp)
        - - Gebiidea (mud lobsters and mud shrimp)
          - - Anomura (hermit crabs and allies)
            - Brachyura ("true" crabs)

In the cladogram above, the clade Glypheidea is excluded due to lack of sufficient DNA evidence, but is likely the sister clade to Polychelida, within Reptantia.

== Classification ==
Classification within the order Decapoda depends on the structure of the gills and legs, and the way in which the larvae develop, giving rise to two suborders: Dendrobranchiata and Pleocyemata. The Dendrobranchiata consist of prawns, including many species colloquially referred to as "shrimp", such as the "white shrimp", Litopenaeus setiferus. The Pleocyemata include the remaining groups, including "true shrimp". Those groups that usually walk rather than swim (Pleocyemata, excluding Stenopodidea and Caridea) form a clade called Reptantia.

This classification to the level of superfamilies follows De Grave et al.

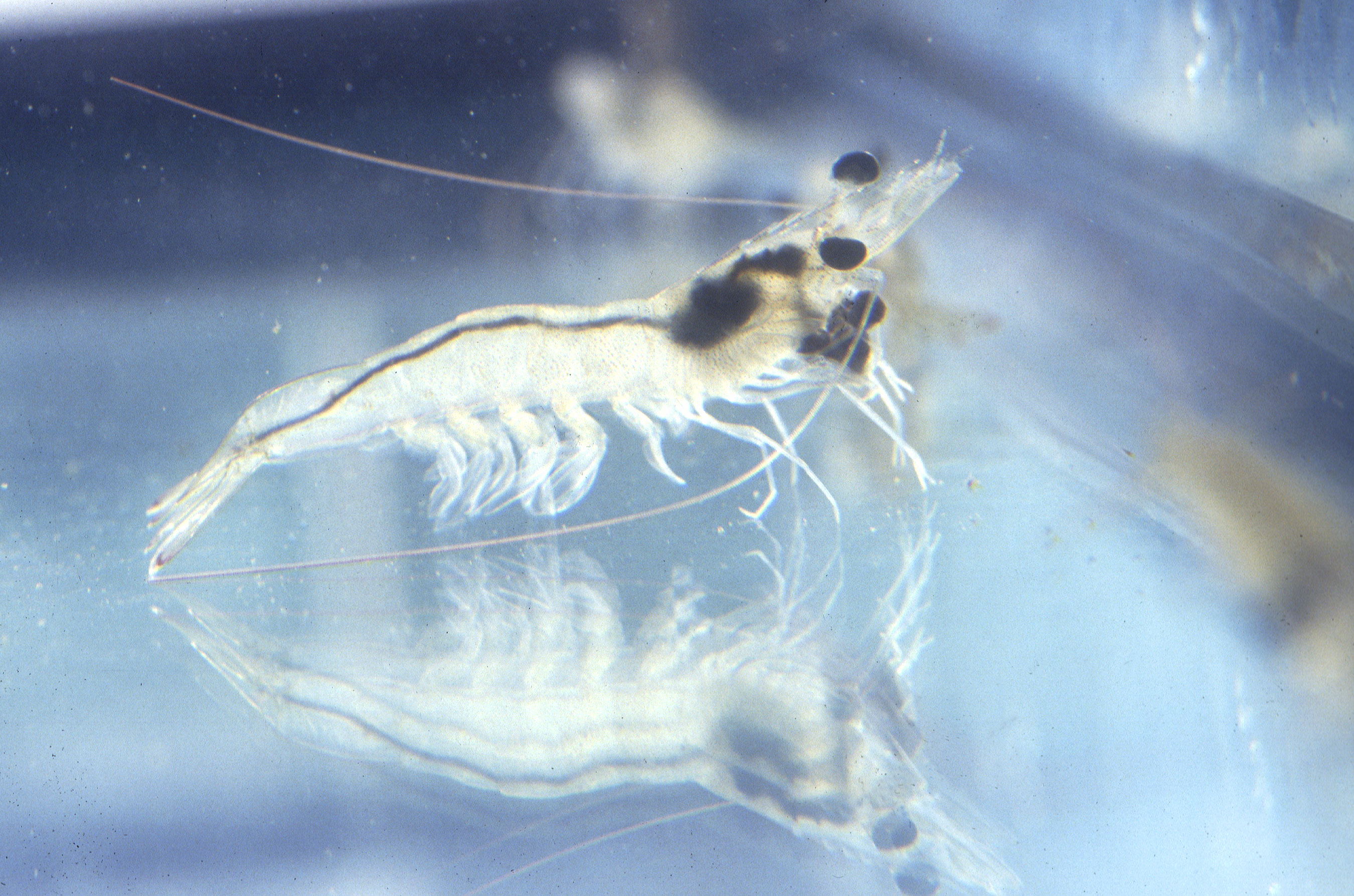
Whiteleg shrimp, Litopenaeus vannamei (Dendrobranchiata: Penaeoidea)

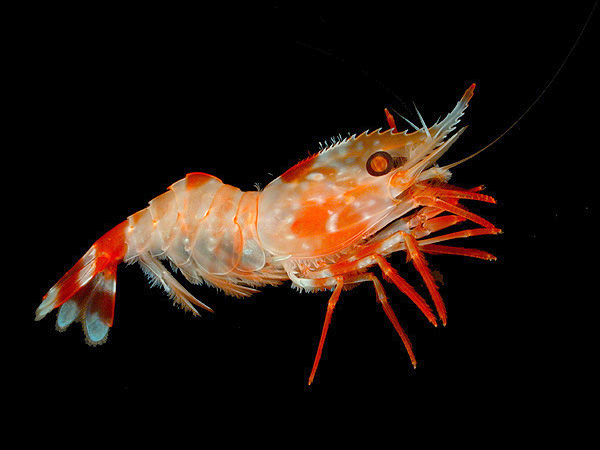
Heterocarpus ensifer (Caridea: Pandaloidea)

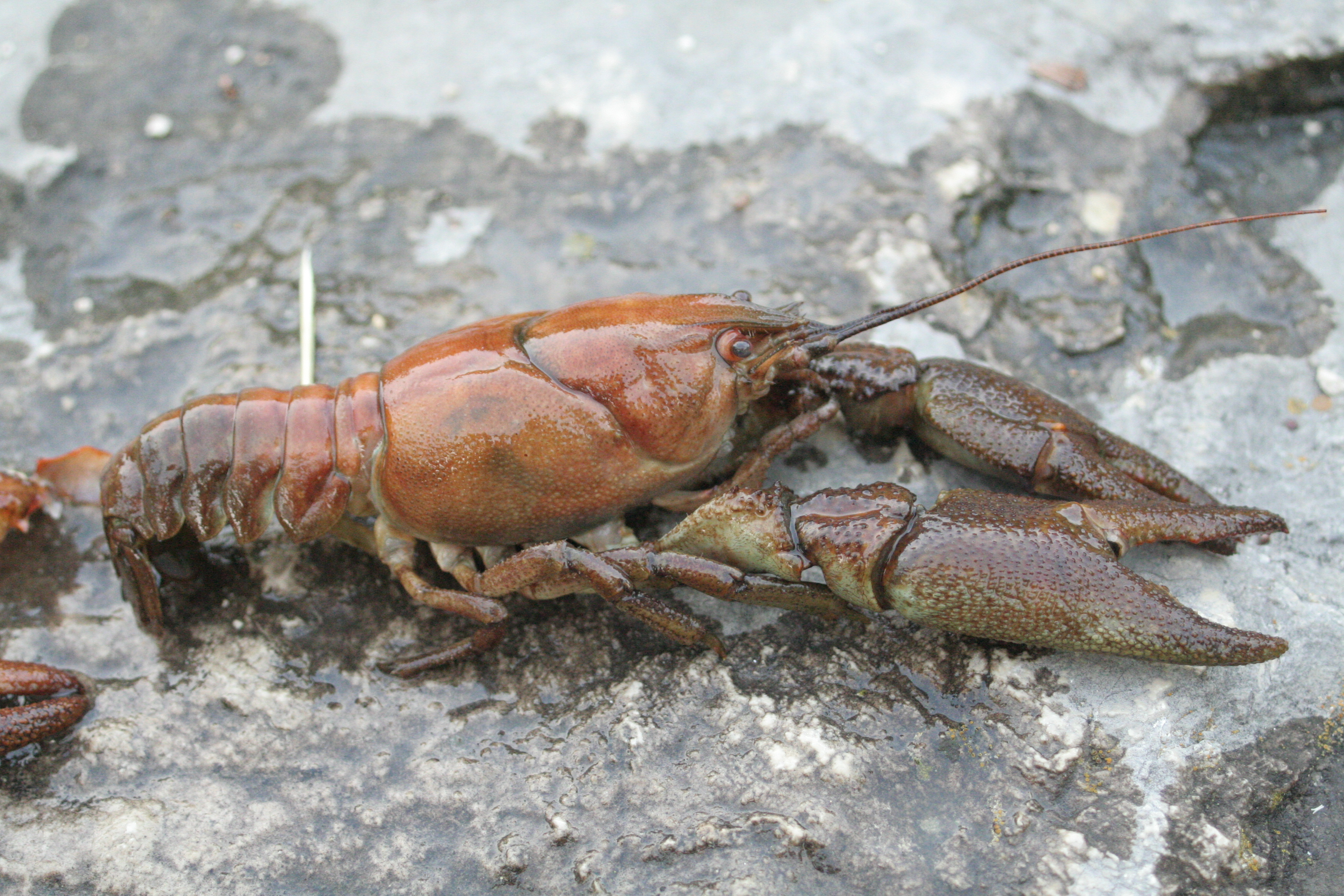
Austropotamobius pallipes (Astacidea: Astacoidea)

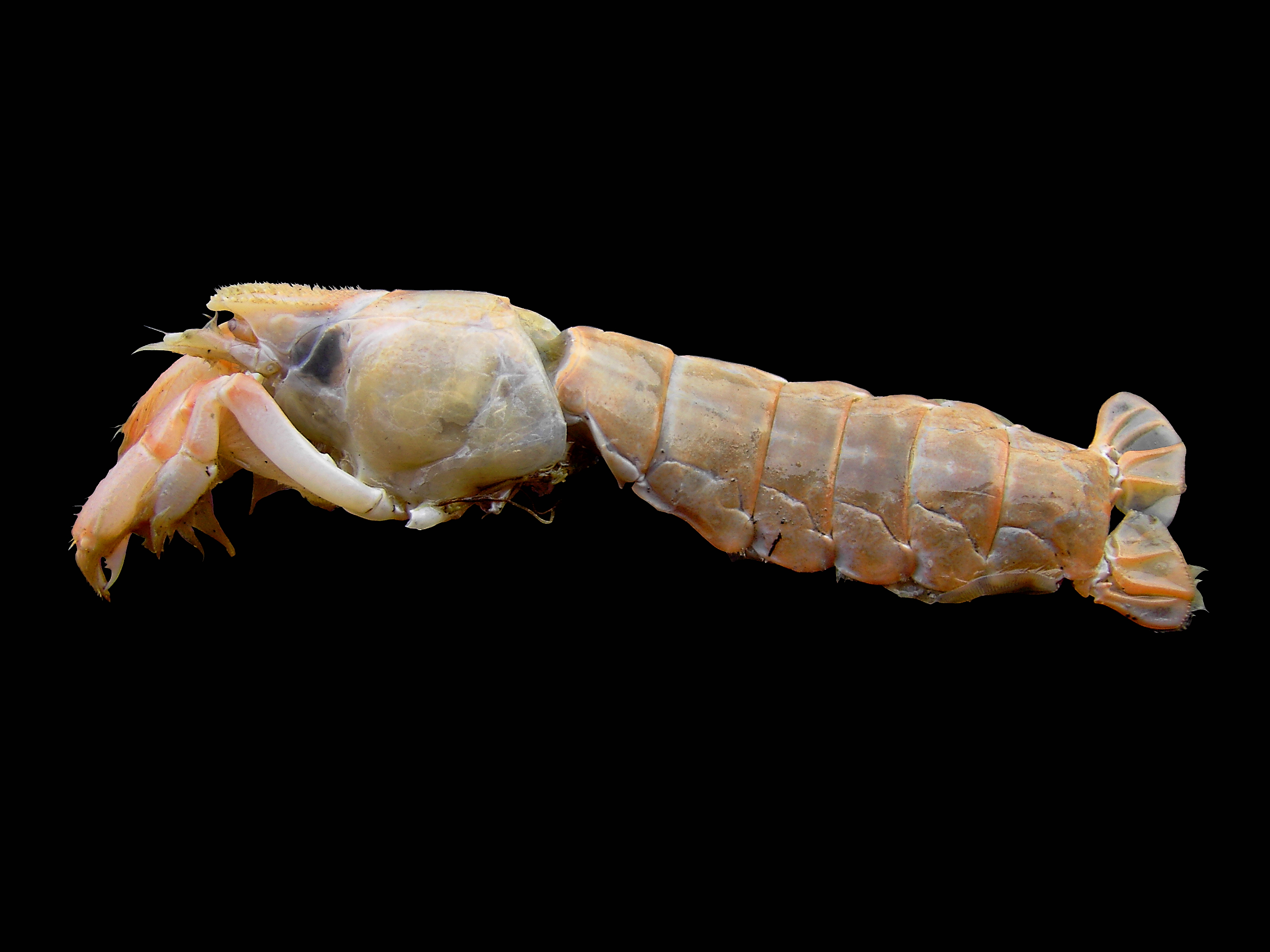
Upogebia deltaura (Gebiidea: Upogebiidae)

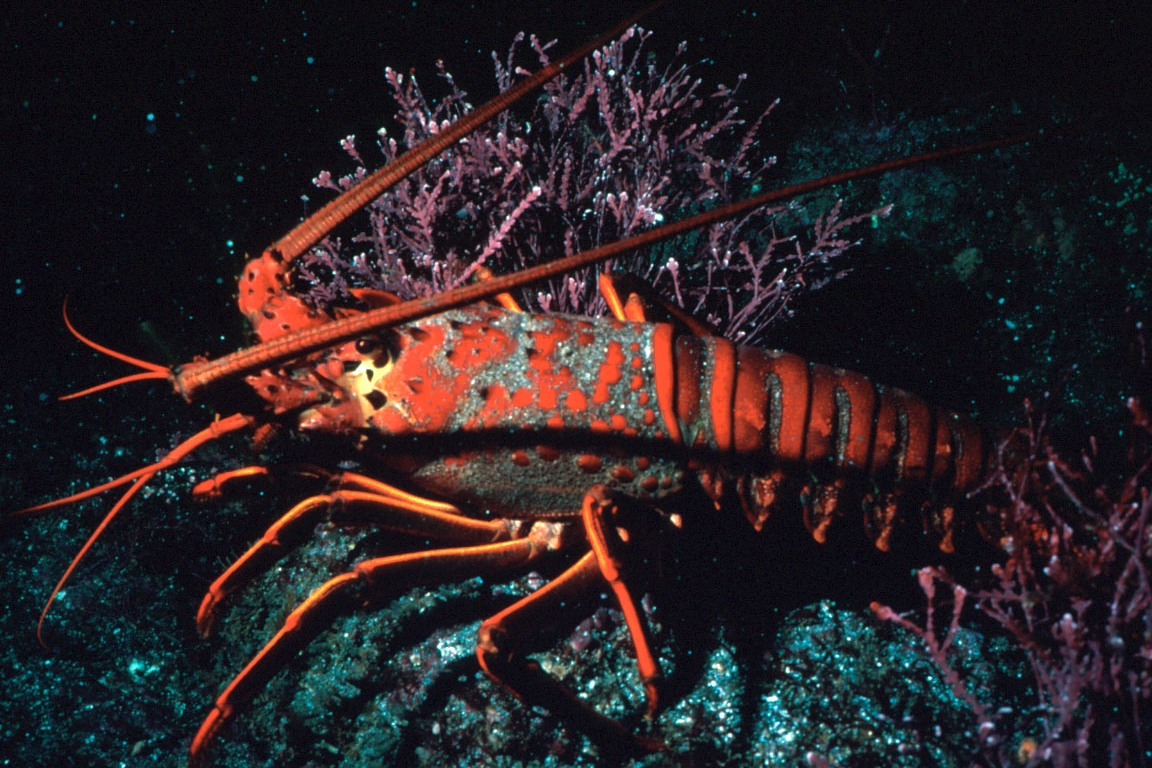
California spiny lobster, Panulirus interruptus (Achelata: Palinuridae)

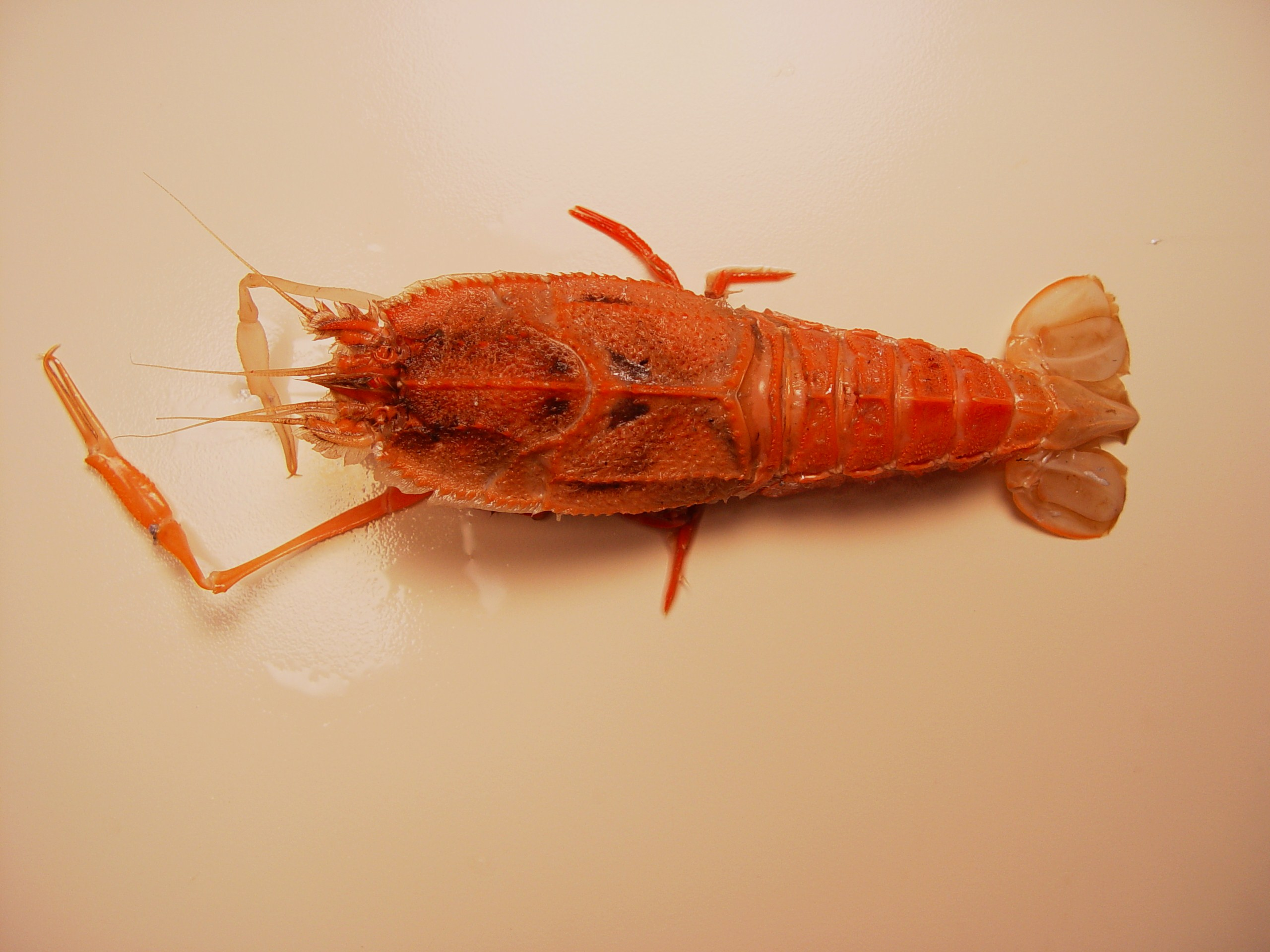
Polycheles sculptus (Polychelida: Polychelidae)

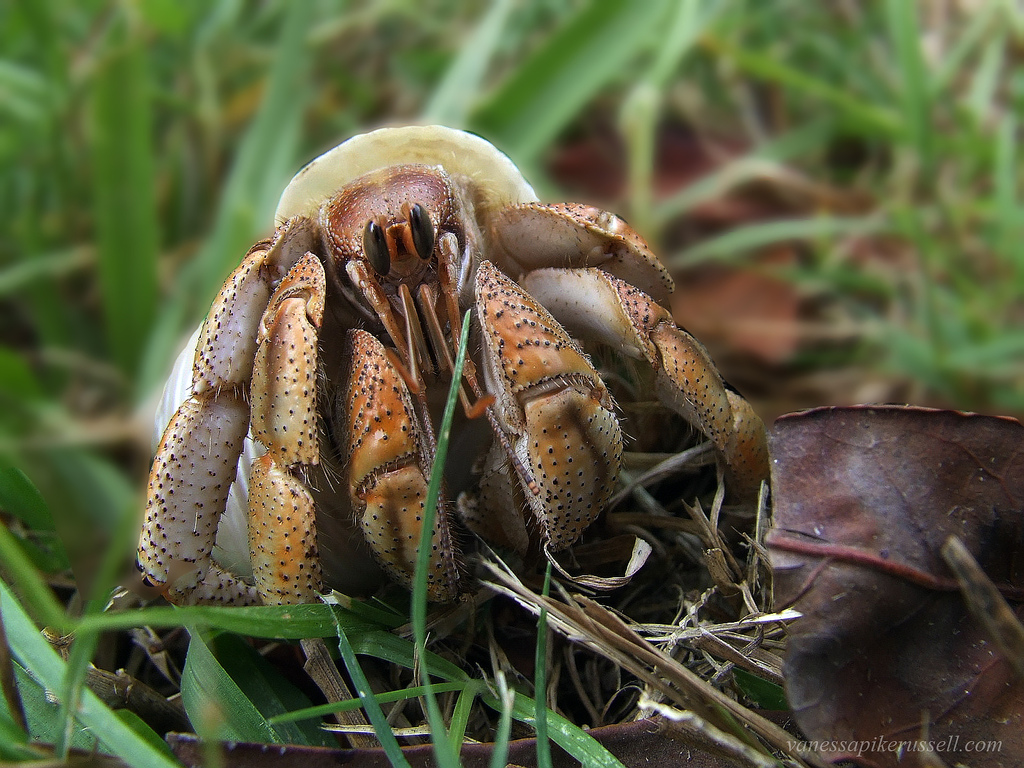
Australian land hermit crab, Coenobita variabilis (Anomura: Paguroidea)

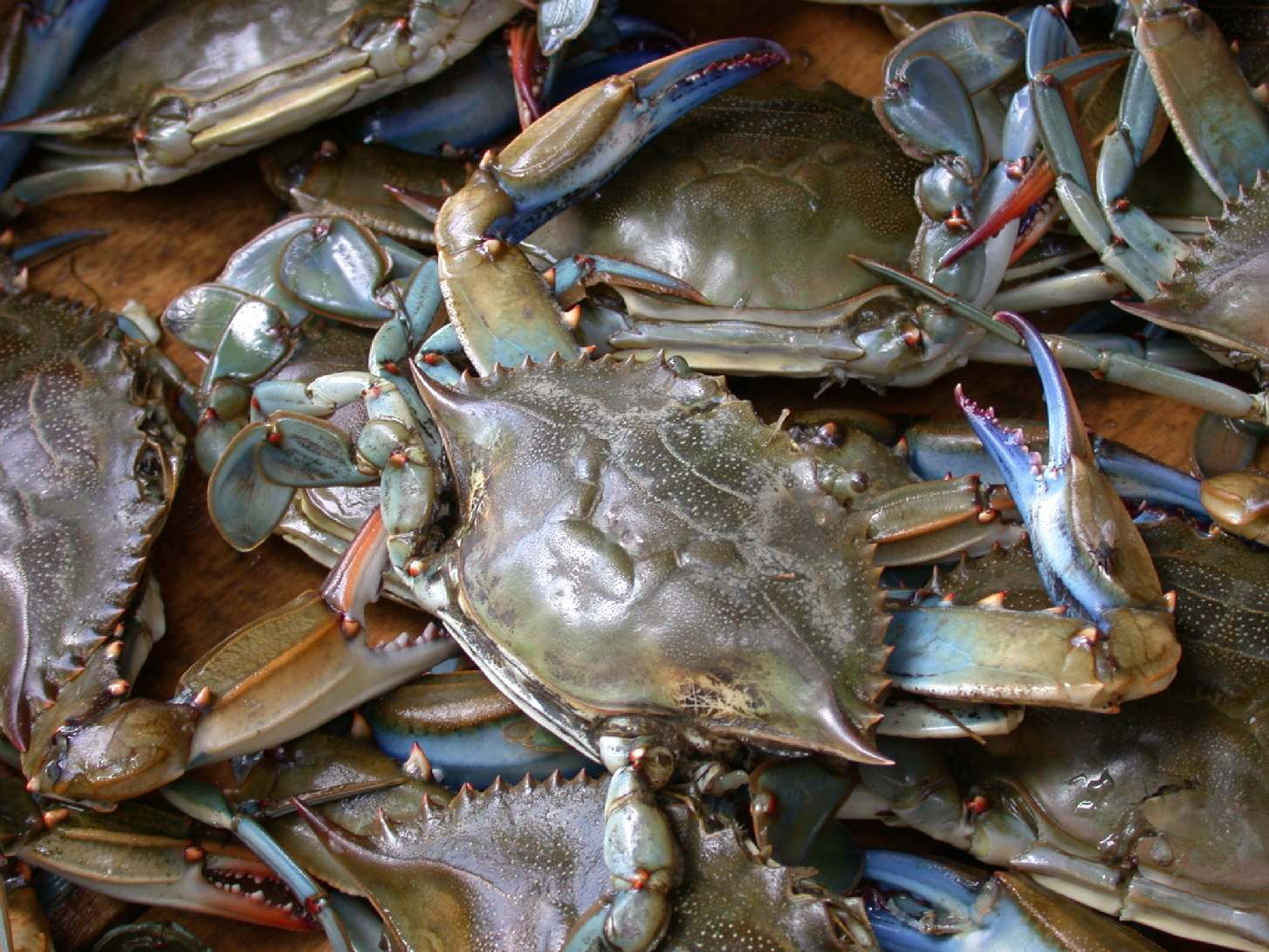
Atlantic blue crab, Callinectes sapidus (Brachyura: Portunoidea)

Order Decapoda Latreille, 1802

- Suborder Dendrobranchiata Bate, 1888
  - Penaeoidea Rafinesque, 1815
  - Sergestoidea Dana, 1852
- Suborder Pleocyemata Burkenroad, 1963
  - Infraorder Stenopodidea Bate, 1888
  - Infraorder Caridea Dana, 1852
    - Procaridoidea Chace & Manning, 1972
    - Galatheacaridoidea Vereshchaka, 1997
    - Pasiphaeoidea Dana, 1852
    - Oplophoroidea Dana, 1852
    - Atyoidea De Haan, 1849
    - Bresilioidea Calman, 1896
    - Nematocarcinoidea Smith, 1884
    - Psalidopodoidea Wood-....., 1874
    - Stylodactyloidea Bate, 1888
    - Campylonotoidea Sollaud, 1913
    - Palaemonoidea Rafinesque, 1815
    - Alpheoidea Rafinesque, 1815
    - Processoidea Ortmann, 1896
    - Pandaloidea Haworth, 1825
    - Physetocaridoidea Chace, 1940
    - Crangonoidea Haworth, 1825
  - Infraorder Astacidea Latreille, 1802
    - Enoplometopoidea de Saint Laurent, 1988
    - Nephropoidea Dana, 1852
    - Astacoidea Latreille, 1802
    - Parastacoidea Huxley, 1879
  - Infraorder Glypheidea Winckler, 1882
    - Glypheoidea Winckler, 1882
  - Infraorder Axiidea de Saint Laurent, 1979b
  - Infraorder Gebiidea de Saint Laurent, 1979
  - Infraorder Achelata Scholtz & Richter, 1995
  - Infraorder Polychelida Scholtz & Richter, 1995
  - Infraorder Anomura MacLeay, 1838
    - Aegloidea Dana, 1852
    - Galatheoidea Samouelle, 1819
    - Hippoidea Latreille, 1825a
    - Chirostyloidea Ortmann, 1892
    - Lomisoidea Bouvier, 1895
    - Paguroidea Latreille, 1802
  - Infraorder Brachyura Linnaeus, 1758
    - Section Dromiacea De Haan, 1833
      - Dromioidea De Haan, 1833
      - Homolodromioidea Alcock, 1900
      - Homoloidea De Haan, 1839
    - Section Raninoida De Haan, 1839
    - Section Cyclodorippoida Ortmann, 1892
    - Section Eubrachyura de Saint Laurent, 1980
      - Subsection Heterotremata Guinot, 1977
        - Aethroidea Dana, 1851
        - Bellioidea Dana, 1852
        - Bythograeoidea Williams, 1980
        - Calappoidea De Haan, 1833
        - Cancroidea Latreille, 1802
        - Carpilioidea Ortmann, 1893
        - Cheiragonoidea Ortmann, 1893
        - Corystoidea Samouelle, 1819
        - Dairoidea Serène, 1965
        - Dorippoidea MacLeay, 1838
        - Eriphioidea MacLeay, 1838
        - Gecarcinucoidea Rathbun, 1904
        - Goneplacoidea MacLeay, 1838
        - Hexapodoidea Miers, 1886
        - Leucosioidea Samouelle, 1819
        - Majoidea Samouelle, 1819
        - Orithyioidea Dana, 1852c
        - Palicoidea Bouvier, 1898
        - Parthenopoidea MacLeay,
        - Pilumnoidea Samouelle, 1819
        - Portunoidea Rafinesque, 1815
        - Potamoidea Ortmann, 1896
        - Pseudothelphusoidea Ortmann, 1893
        - Pseudozioidea Alcock, 1898
        - Retroplumoidea Gill, 1894
        - Trapezioidea Miers, 1886
        - Trichodactyloidea H. Milne-Edwards, 1853
        - Xanthoidea MacLeay, 1838
      - Subsection Thoracotremata Guinot, 1977
        - Cryptochiroidea Paul'son, 1875
        - Grapsoidea MacLeay, 1838
        - Ocypodoidea Rafinesque, 1815
        - Pinnotheroidea De Haan, 1833

== See also ==
- List of Atlantic decapod species
- Phylogeny of Malacostraca
