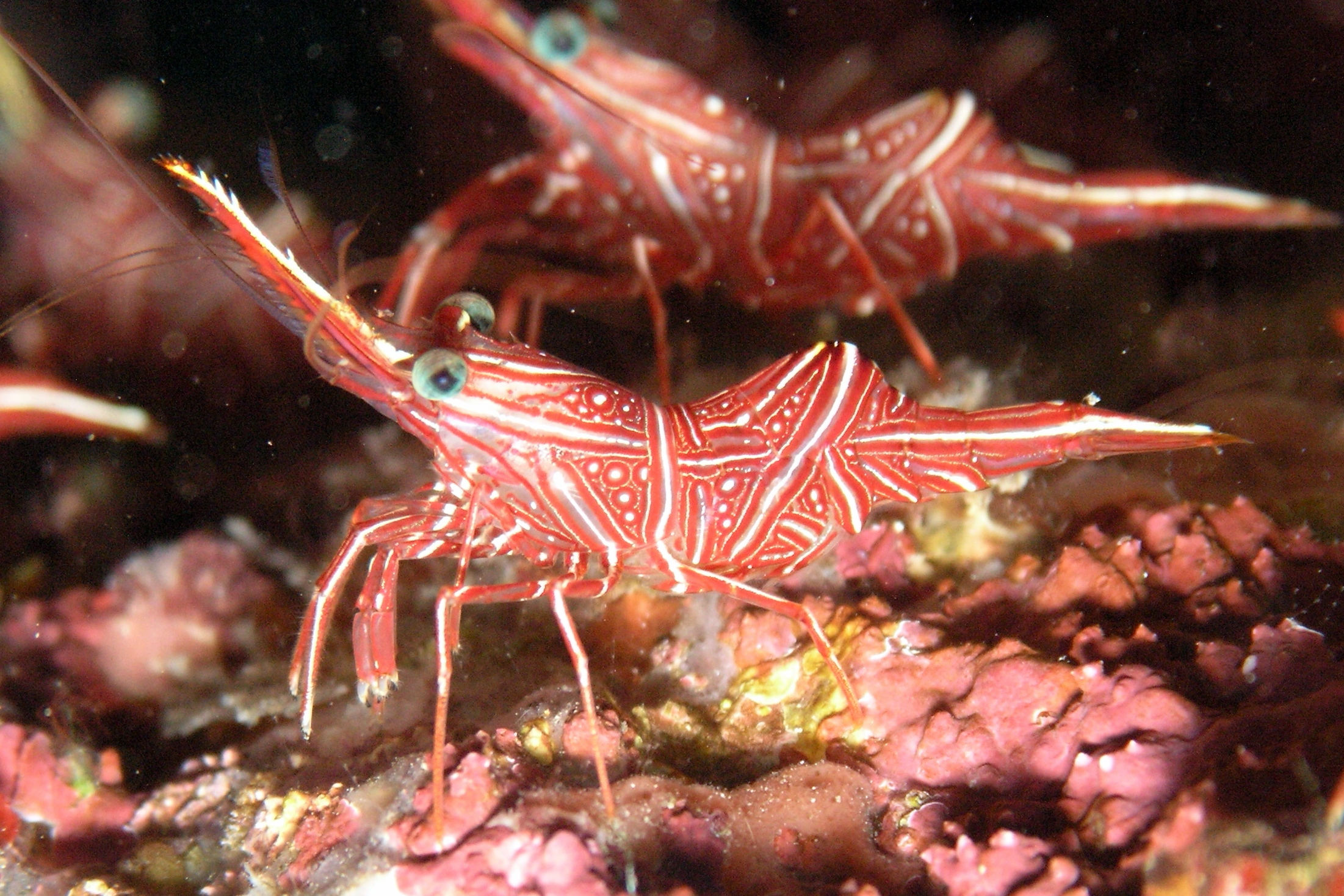

Scientific classification
- Domain: Eukaryota
- Kingdom: Animalia
- Phylum: Arthropoda
- Class: Malacostraca
- Order: Decapoda
- Suborder: Pleocyemata
- Infraorder: Caridea
- Family: Rhynchocinetidae
- Genus: Rhynchocinetes
- Species: R. durbanensis

Binomial name
- Rhynchocinetes durbanensis Gordon, 1936

= Rhynchocinetes durbanensis =

Species of crustacean

Rhynchocinetes durbanensis, commonly known as the camel shrimp and the hingebeak prawn, is a species of shrimp (family Rhynchocinetidae) found in the Indo-Pacific. Up to 4 cm (1.6 in) in length, the shrimp has large black eyes, and features red and white lines on a translucent body. It has many white ocelli (spots) as well as a Y-shaped white mark on the upper front part of its carapace. It is strongly sexually dimorphic, and dominant males have larger first pair of chelipeds. The shrimp is found in hollows and crevices from 5 to 35 metres (16 to 115 ft) deep, where it forms groups consisting of dozens of individuals. One study determined that the ovigerous females carry from 267 to 1764 eggs, and the eggs take 9 days to hatch after spawning at a temperature of 29.2 °C (84.6 °F), or 18 days when the temperature is under 22.0 °C (71.6 °F). R. durbanensis has been frequently confused with R. uritai, and also closely resembles R. brucei. R. durbanensis was first described scientifically by Isabella Gordon in 1936.
