= Kings Place =

Building in London

Coordinates: 51°32′3.63″N 0°7′19.04″W

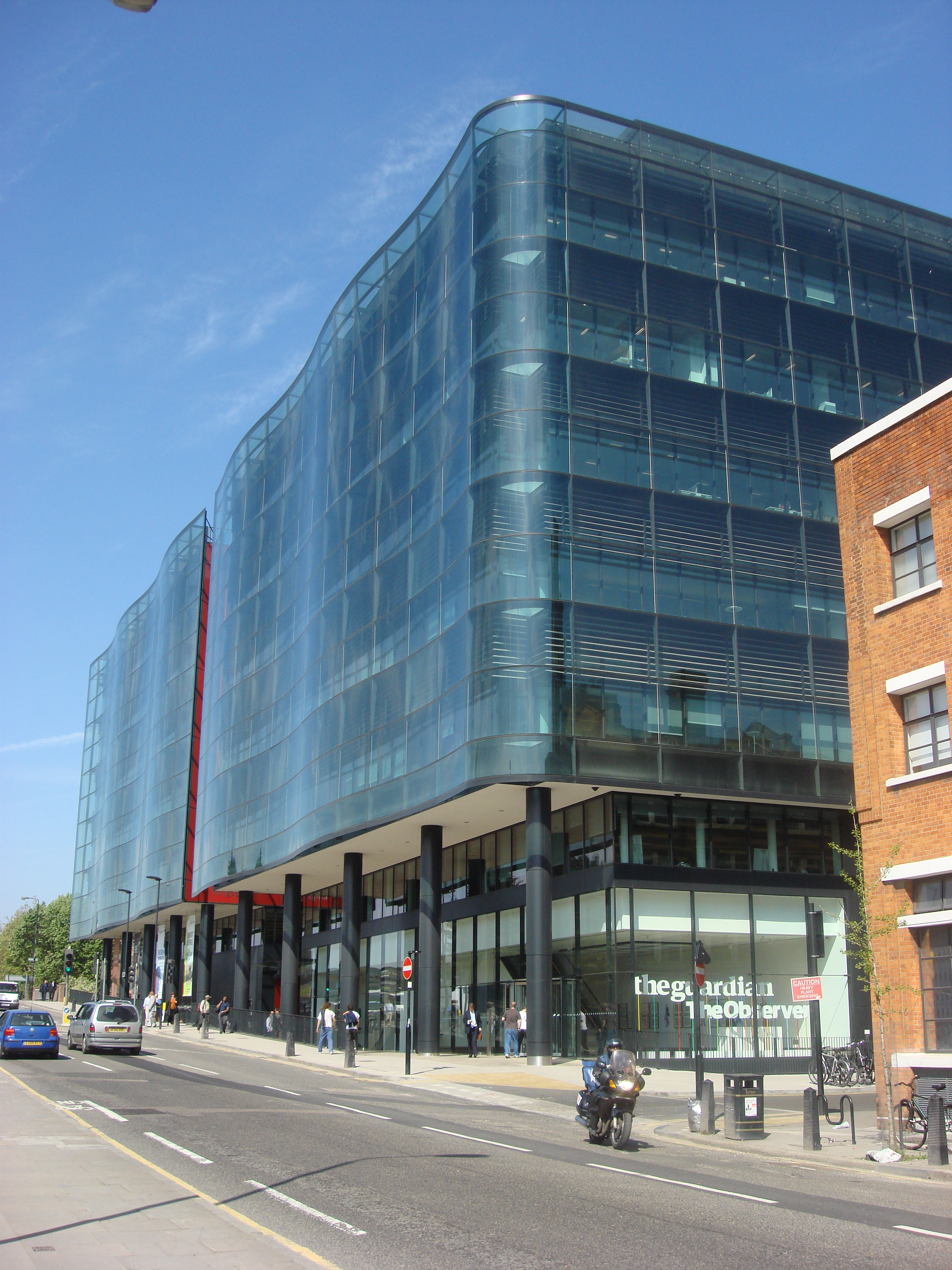
- Kings Place from York Way
- Interactive map of Kings Place
- Address: 90, York Way; London
- Capacity: Hall 1: 415 seats Hall 2: 200 seats
- Type: Classical / Contemporary music, Arts / Cultural venue, Spoken Word, commercial office space, restaurant
- Designation: Grade A Commercial

Construction
- Opened: 2008
- Architect: Dixon Jones

Website
- www.kingsplace.co.uk

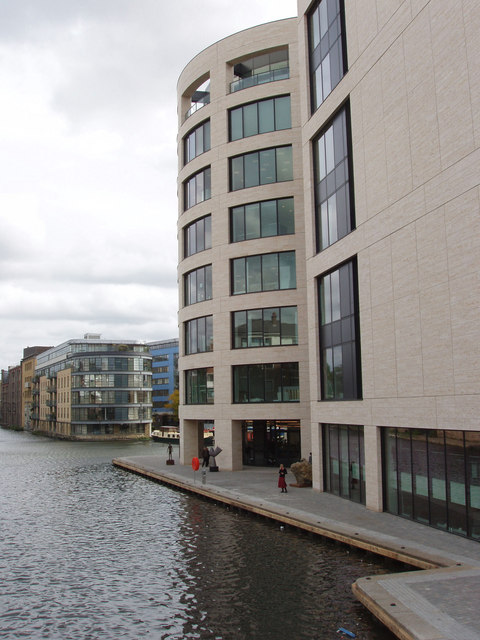
Kings Place concert hall terrace

Kings Place is a building in London's King's Cross area, providing music and visual arts venues combined with seven floors of office space. It has housed the editorial offices of The Guardian newspaper since December 2008 and is the former headquarters of Network Rail and CGI.

== Overview ==
Kings Place was a commercial development providing 26,000 m^{2} (280,000 sq ft) of office space. Construction on the site began in 2005 and was completed in summer 2008; the opening festival started on 1 October 2008. In late 2008, the building became the home for The Guardian and The Observer newspapers.

Kings Place houses the first public concert hall to be newly built in central London since the completion of the Barbican Centre concert hall in 1982. (Cadogan Hall and LSO St Luke's were adapted from old buildings in that period.)

It has a range of facilities for performance, exhibition and education. The music, arts and restaurant areas are arranged around public spaces which form a central hub to the building. The arts facilities include free access to a range of commercial art galleries. Kings Place is home to Aurora Orchestra as its resident orchestra, and also regularly hosts a number of other artistic associates including the Orchestra of the Age of Enlightenment and London Sinfonietta. The opera company OperaUpClose announced that it would move from its present Islington pub location, the King's Head, to Kings Place in 2015.

== Kings Place Music Foundation (charity) ==
Kings Place Music Foundation is the charity set up to run the music spaces at Kings Place.

The charity works in partnership with music and arts organisations to offer a range of learning and participation activities to the local community and to the wider public. Activities began before the construction of the building finished and are growing steadily year by year.

KPMF offers access to creative spaces and activities for both new and established audiences with affordable prices for all. The KMPF music programme is funded entirely by revenue from ticket sales and income generated through event and conference hire, and without reliance on public funding.

== Location ==
Kings Place sits on the east side of York Way, 150 metres from King's Cross/St Pancras train stations. On its eastern side the building overlooks Battlebridge Basin on the Regent's Canal which is also home to many residential boats and the London Canal Museum.

Central St Martins, one of the art colleges within the University of the Arts London, brought a major visual arts community into the area from mid-2011, when it moved into the nearby Argent's 67-acre (270,000 m^{2}) King's Cross Central development.

== Architectural philosophy ==
Following a limited architectural competition, Dixon Jones was appointed as the architect for Kings Place. The brief was for it to be a large building of far higher quality than the normal spec office development. The building was to be durable, not only in terms of quality of the build materials, but in its design. It had to be spatially generous and environmentally impeccable. Most importantly, it had to fit into a local urban architecture which is not uniform in scale.

== Features ==
The building has wavy glass runs along the west-facing York Way frontage; this three-layered glass façade is a free-standing transparent surface made up of hundreds of very slightly curved sheets of glass. As well as reducing heat gain from the afternoon sun and increasing wind resistance, the glass wall provides Kings Place with a distinctive facade.

== Facilities ==
- Hall One – 415-seat concert hall with fixed seating (302 seats in the stalls and 113 in the balcony)
- Hall Two – flexible performance and rehearsal space (seats audience of 200 or 330 standing)
- St Pancras Room – auditorium for speech, seating 100
- Three rehearsal break-out spaces:
  - Limehouse Room
  - Wenlock Room
  - Horsfall Room
- Recording and broadcasting facilities
- General dressing rooms
- Office space and headquarters for London Sinfonietta and the Orchestra of the Age of Enlightenment
- The Music Base – shared office space with desks for small music organisations
- Pangolin London:
  - Sculpture gallery

== Hall One ==
Hall One, the main concert hall, is a separate structure within the building, it is a box that sits on rubber springs to give it complete acoustic separation from the rest of the building.

It is built to a regular geometry, a double cube, that is considered most successful for small concert halls. Structural columns around the hall are set away from the walls to allow curtains to be drawn between the columns and the walls to modify the acoustics for speech or amplified music.

It won the "Commercial and Public Access" award and the overall "Gold Award" in the 2009 Wood Awards.

=== Acoustics ===
The architecture of Hall One emerged from a collaboration between Dixon Jones and Arup's acousticians. As part of the research that preceded the design, the developer, the architects, the engineers and the project manager visited Japan to look in detail at a dozen concert halls. The aim was to differentiate very precisely between a variety of modern concert halls and to examine what solution would best meet the requirements of Kings Place. Next a computer model of the proposed Kings Place auditorium was made. This was tested against computer models of the Concertgebouw, the Wigmore and several other halls. In this way it was possible to optimise the design for Hall One before construction began.

=== Oak veneer ===
The oak veneer inside Hall One has come from the same 500-year-old German oak tree named Contessa. After felling the wood was cut into 5-metre lengths and boiled at 80 °C for one week, then sliced. The tree produced an acre (4,000 m^{2}) of wood veneer. It has been used in Hall One to cover the panels, columns, roof coffers, the back of seats, and doors.

== Food and drink ==
The Rotunda Restaurant spans the area of the building facing Regent's Canal and Battlebridge Basin. The Rotunda Bar features a curved bar that mirrors the shape of the building. The Green & Fortune Café is housed in the central atrium of the building on the ground floor level. Green & Fortune is responsible for all food, drink, and hospitality at Kings Place.

== Offices ==
All seven levels above ground at Kings Place are commercial office space. From some angles Kings Place can be seen as four joined but separate structures. This breaking down of the mass of the building was critical to the planners and has allowed light and a sense of openness to penetrate to basement level. Thanks to a series of linking bridges, however, each of the upper floors is experienced by the office user as a very large contiguous plate.

For the office users no staircase was provided for general use so the only way to access above ground floors is via the lifts. This makes for inconvenience when the lifts break down and reduces the green impact of the building. The two common staircases have been designed so as only to be available in case of fire.

== Outreach programme ==
Kings Place promotes discovery of the arts in its surrounding boroughs of Islington and Camden. The Kings Place outreach programme works in three areas: Education, Community Engagement and Participation and Family. Music and arts organisations resident and performing at Kings Place offer educational classes, workshops, opportunities for participation in performances as well as family events. Past events and projects have included family drumming workshops and professional development sessions with the London Sinfonietta and their visiting musicians from the Ugandan Dance Academy and a visual arts project with local schools and the Visual Learning Foundation using the construction of the building as inspiration.
