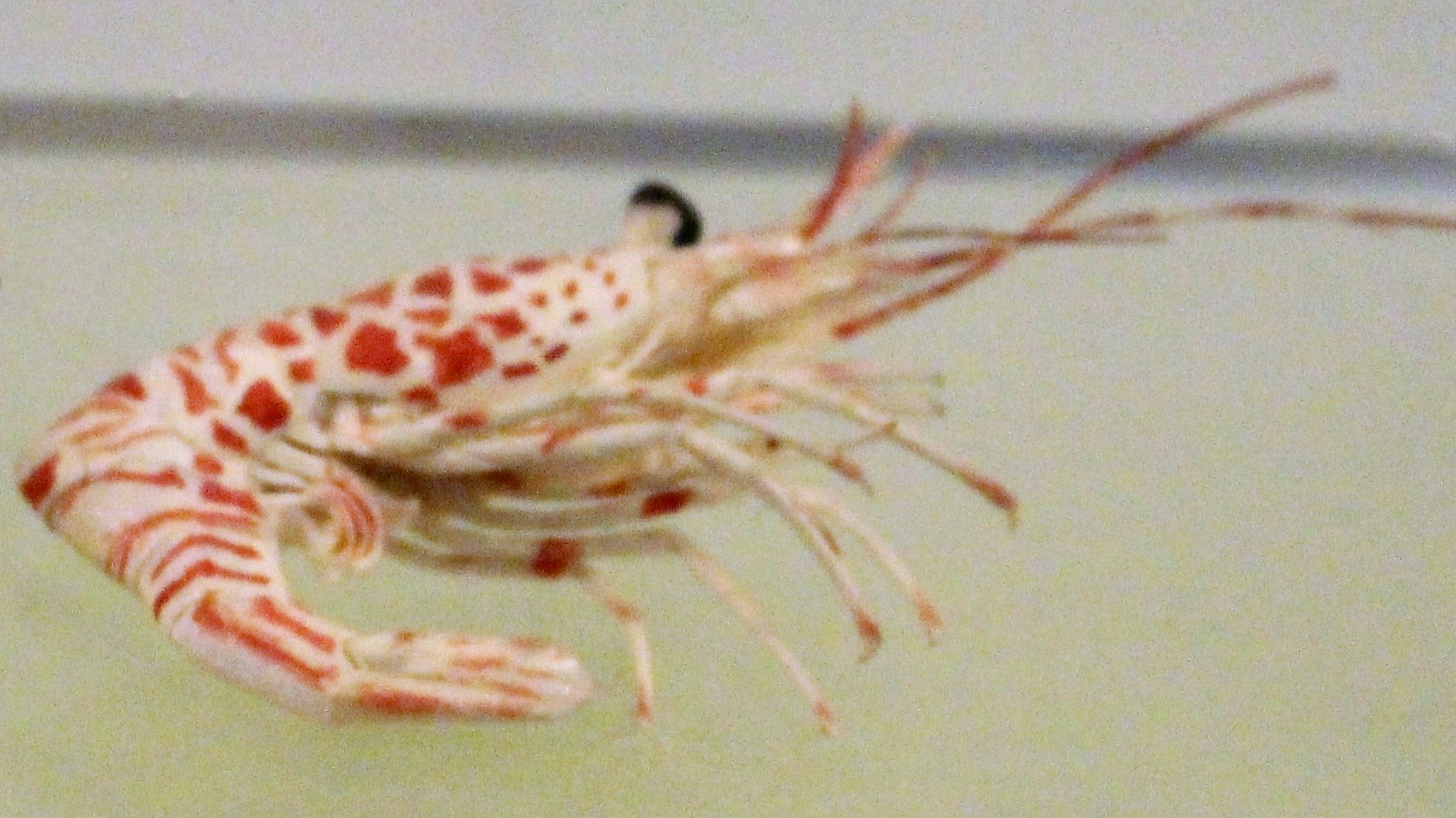
- C. rigens at the Natural History Museum, London

Scientific classification
- Domain: Eukaryota
- Kingdom: Animalia
- Phylum: Arthropoda
- Class: Malacostraca
- Order: Decapoda
- Suborder: Pleocyemata
- Infraorder: Caridea
- Family: Rhynchocinetidae
- Genus: Cinetorhynchus
- Species: C. rigens

Binomial name
- Cinetorhynchus rigens (Gordon, 1936)

Synonyms
- Rhynchocinetes rigens Gordon, 1936

= Cinetorhynchus rigens =

Species of shrimp

Cinetorhynchus rigens is a species of shrimp in the family Rhynchocinetidae. Common names include mechanical shrimp, Atlantic dancing shrimp, red night shrimp and red coral shrimp. It occurs in shallow water in the tropical Atlantic Ocean.

== Description ==
Like other members of its family, Cinetorhynchus rigens has an upward-hinging, foldable rostrum. The body is robust, especially the cephalothorax, with a length of up to 8 cm (3 in). The rostrum has three large and two small teeth dorsally and eight or nine teeth ventrally. The eyes are particularly noticeable, the corneas being rounded and much larger than the eyestalks. The third abdominal segment is prominently humped. The first pair of walking legs are tipped with pincers and the other walking legs are more slender. The general colour of this shrimp is red and white, the rostrum being white with a patchwork of red blotches, the abdomen transversely striped with red and white and the legs banded in the same colours. At night, some of the white pigment is withdrawn into the chromatophores at the base of the legs and the colouring is more subdued. The eggs are yellow or orange; they may make the cephalothorax appear yellowish while they are maturing in the ovary, and the abdomen yellowish while they are being incubated.

== Distribution and habitat ==
This species occurs in the tropical Atlantic Ocean. Its range extends from Portugal southwards to the equator and includes the Azores, Madeira, the Canaries and the Cape Verde Islands. It also occurs in the Gulf of Mexico, the Caribbean Sea, and from Bermuda southwards to Brazil. It was first described in 1936 by the Scottish marine biologist Isabella Gordon, the type locality being Madeira. Further specimens were recorded from the Ryukyu Islands by the Japanese zoologist Takahiro Fujino in 1975, but on further examination, these are likely to be a different species and have been given the new species name of Cinetorhynchus erythrostictus. C. rigens is usually found at depths of less than 10 m (30 ft), in crevices and caves on rocky shores and coral reefs.

== Ecology ==
The common name "dancing shrimp" comes from the habit this species has of constantly engaging in jerky movements. Its diet has not been studied, but it is likely to be a detritivore, also consuming small invertebrates and organic particles. Examination of its faeces reveal sponge spicules, fragments of mollusc shells and algae. It is nocturnal, concealing itself during the day, sometimes in large numbers, in fissures among boulders. Its association with the sea urchin Diadema antillarum varies with the phase of the Moon, and it is often associated with sea anemones such as Telmatactis cricoides, Bartholomea annulata, Condylactis gigantea, and Lebrunia neglecta. In Brazil, it has been found sharing crevices with the brown spiny lobster Panulirus echinatus. The shrimp is preyed on by predatory fish, cephalopods and larger crustaceans. In the Caribbean, it forms part of the diet of the invasive lionfishes Pterois volitans and Pterois miles.
