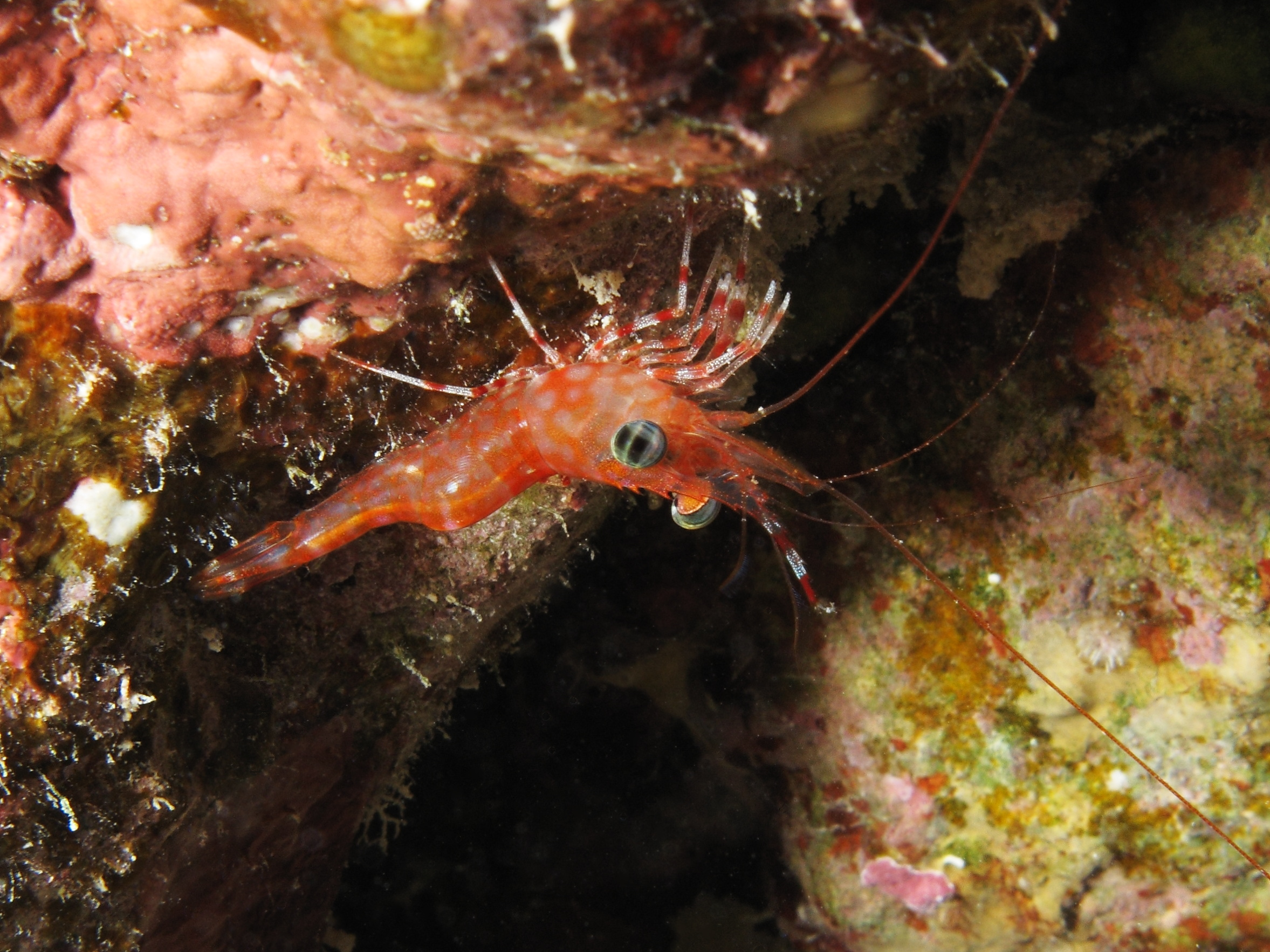
- Female C. reticulates from the Red Sea

Scientific classification
- Kingdom: Animalia
- Phylum: Arthropoda
- Clade: Pancrustacea
- Class: Malacostraca
- Order: Decapoda
- Suborder: Pleocyemata
- Infraorder: Caridea
- Family: Rhynchocinetidae
- Genus: Cinetorhynchus
- Species: C. reticulatus

Binomial name
- Cinetorhynchus reticulatus Okuno, 1997

= Cinetorhynchus reticulatus =

Species of crustacean

Cinetorhynchus reticulatus is a species of shrimp belonging to the family Rhynchocinetidae, known by the common name green-eye dancing shrimp or reticulated hinge-beak shrimp.

== Distribution ==
Cinetorhynchus reticulatus is widespread throughout the tropical waters of the Indo-Pacific region, including the Red Sea.

== Description ==
Cinetorhynchus reticulatus is a small shrimp, reach a maximum length of 6 centimetres (2.4 in).
