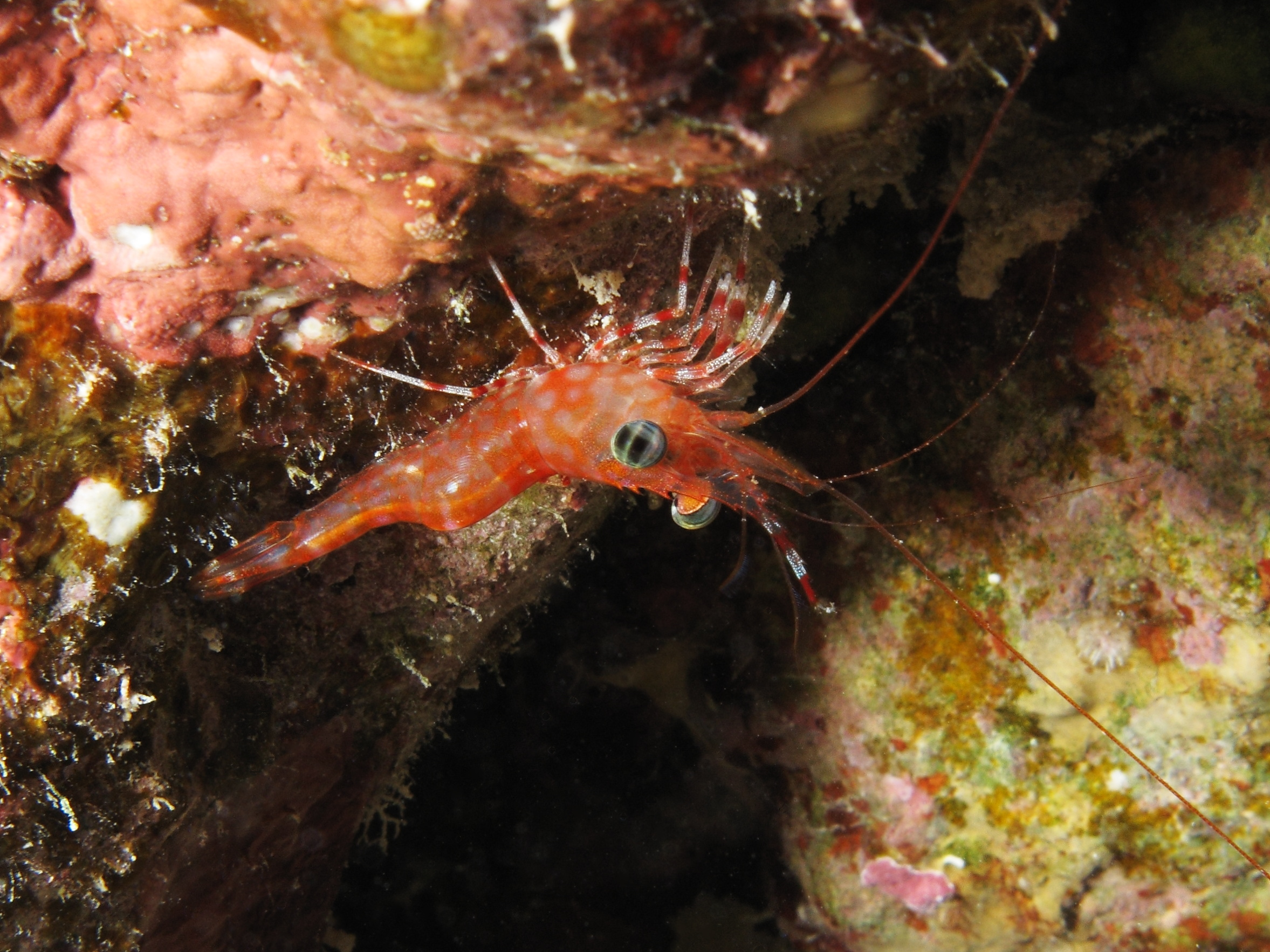
- Female C. reticulates from the Red Sea

Scientific classification
- Domain: Eukaryota
- Kingdom: Animalia
- Phylum: Arthropoda
- Class: Malacostraca
- Order: Decapoda
- Suborder: Pleocyemata
- Infraorder: Caridea
- Family: Rhynchocinetidae
- Genus: Cinetorhynchus; Holthuis, 1995

= Cinetorhynchus =

Genus of crustaceans

Cinetorhynchus is a genus of shrimp in the family Rhynchocinetidae. It was originally described in 1995 by Lipke Holthuis as a subgenus of the genus Rhynchocinetes, but was elevated to the rank of genus by Okuno in 1997. Both genera share the characteristic jointed rostrum, but differ in the numbers and positions of various spines. Cinetorhynchus contains the following species:

- Cinetorhynchus brucei Okuno, 2009
- Cinetorhynchus concolor (Okuno, 1994)
- Cinetorhynchus erythrostictus Okuno, 1997
- Cinetorhynchus fasciatus Okuno & Tachikawa, 1997
- Cinetorhynchus gabonensis Ďuriš, Šobáňová & Wirtz, 2019
- Cinetorhynchus hawaiiensis Okuno & Hoover, 1998
- Cinetorhynchus hendersoni (Kemp, 1925)
- Cinetorhynchus hiatti (Holthuis & Hayashi, 1967)
- Cinetorhynchus manningi Okuno, 1996
- Cinetorhynchus reticulatus Okuno, 1997
- Cinetorhynchus rigens (Gordon, 1936)
- Cinetorhynchus striatus (Nomura & Hayashi, 1992)
