= Irene Manton =

British botanist

Irene Manton FRS
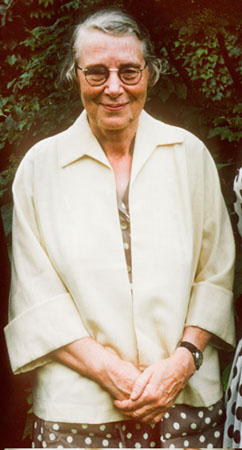
- Born: 17 April 1904; Kensington, London
- Died: 13 May 1988 (aged 84)
- Education: St Paul's Girls' School
- Alma mater: Girton College, Cambridge (PhD, 1930)
- Awards: Linnean Medal (1969); Schleiden Medal (1972)
- Scientific career
- Fields: Botany, Genetics, Electron microscopy
- Workplaces: Girton College, Cambridge University of Manchester University of Leeds

Irene Manton, FRS FLS (born Irène Manton; 17 April 1904, in Kensington – 13 May 1988) was a British botanist who was Professor of Botany at the University of Leeds. She was noted for study of ferns and algae.

== Biography ==
Irene Manton was the daughter of dental surgeon, George Manton and embroideress and designer, and descendant of French aristocracy, Milana Manton (née D'Humy). Her first name was originally pronounced and spelled in the French manner; but at 18 she dropped this and opted for "Irene". Her sister was the entomologist Sidnie Manton FRS. She was educated at the Froebel Demonstration School and St. Paul's Girls' School, Hammersmith. While still in school she read Edmund Beecher Wilson’s (1902) The Cell in Development and Heredity prompting an early interest in chromosomes.

== Academic career ==
In 1923 Manton attended Girton College, Cambridge. She found Cambridge unsatisfying, in part because the university as a whole was not yet welcoming of women, and later went on to study with Gustaf Otto Rosenberg in Stockholm. Manton obtained a lecturing position at the University of Manchester in December 1928. In June 1930 she received her PhD, with her thesis being on Cruciferae. She had to apply for special permission to continue her PhD studies away from Cambridge when she obtained the position at Manchester.

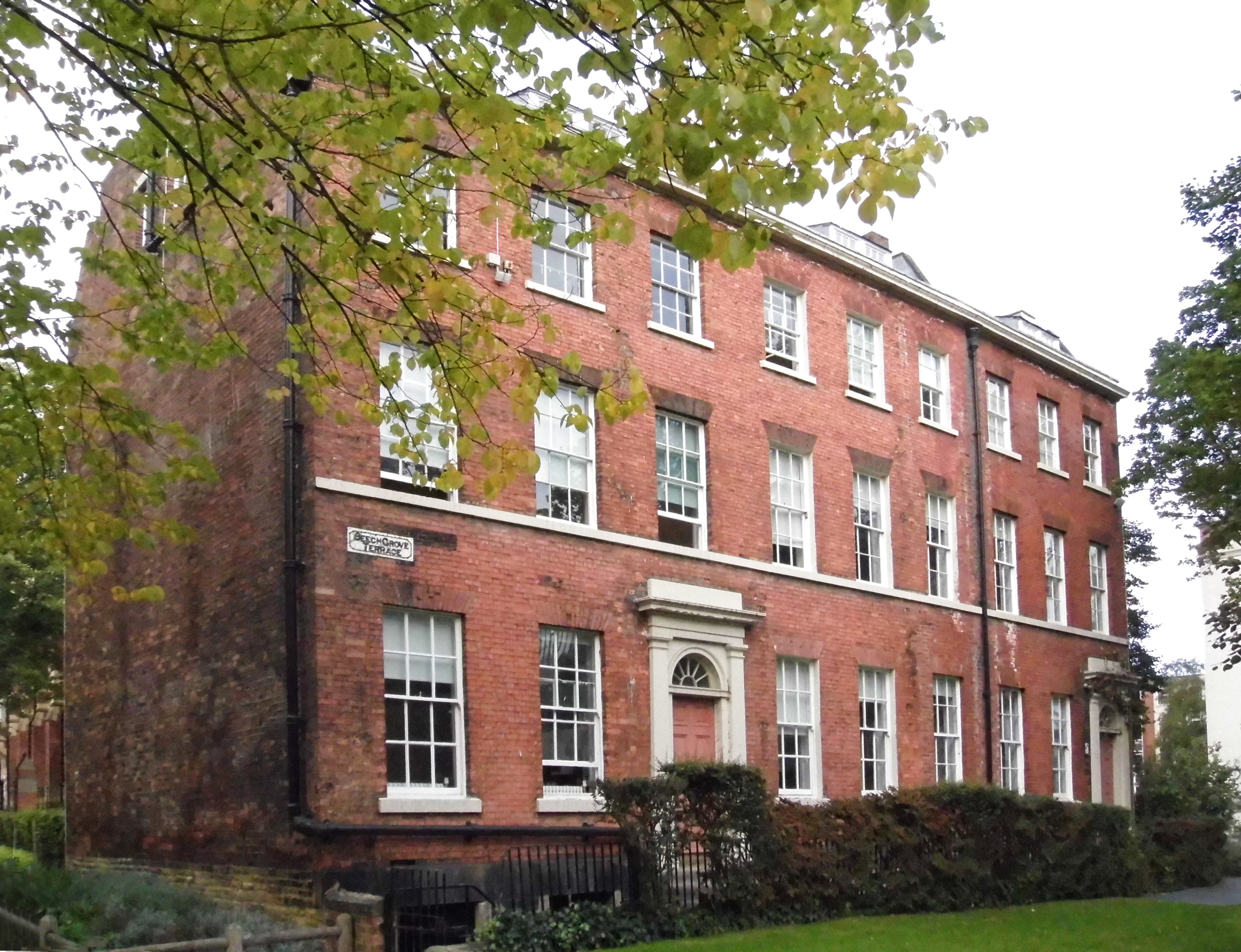
South elevation of Botany House (13/14/15 Beech Grove Terrace) at the University of Leeds, within which Manton made many of her seminal discoveries using the electron microscope. Originally three Georgian town houses, the property was converted into a single building after the University acquired it, also changing the entrance to the much less prepossessing rear of the building. Manton's electron microscopes and associated equipment were located in the basement, where the effects of vibration from traffic, etc. were lowest. The building is now Grade II heritage listed on account of its fine Georgian facade.

Much of her academic career was spent at the University of Leeds where she was Professor of Botany from 1946 until 1969 and Professor Emeritus thereafter and where her focus was on ferns and algae. The work with ferns addressed hybridisation, polyploidy, and apomixis and led to her 1950 book, Problems of cytology and evolution in the pteridophyta. As well as engaging chromosomes for the purposes of evolutionary investigation, Manton carried out research into gross morphological structure using the ultraviolet microscope. This venture proved to be an important stepping stone to her later fine structural research of the cell.

Her work on the algae was notable for its use of the electron microscope and her cytological work became known worldwide for the structure of cilia and flagella she revealed.

Irene Manton originally intended to bequeath her collection of modern and oriental art to the University of Leeds. Many of these pictures hung on the walls of Botany House in the University of Leeds during her career there. However, the majority of her collection instead went to the Peter Scott Gallery, at Lancaster University, now part of Lancaster Arts.

Manton was a co-supervisor (with David Jennings) for then-PhD student Evan Benjamin Gareth Jones, who graduated in 1963 and later became a notable mycologist, and of Patrick Brownsey, who became Curator of Botany at the National Museum of New Zealand. She also taught Mary Gibby while Gibby was an undergraduate at the University of Leeds.

== Honours ==
In 1969 Manton shared the Linnean Medal with Ethelwynn Trewavas.

She was the first female President of the Linnean Society of London, being elected in 1973 and serving until 1976.

She was elected a Fellow of the Royal Society in March 1961 for her work on the ultramicroscopic structure of plants and on their evolution.

In 1969 she was elected a Foreign Honorary Member of the American Academy of Arts and Sciences.

From 1969 to 1972 she was President of the British Pteridological Society.

In 1972, Manton was awarded the Schleiden Medal by the Academy of Sciences Leopoldina.

== Legacy ==
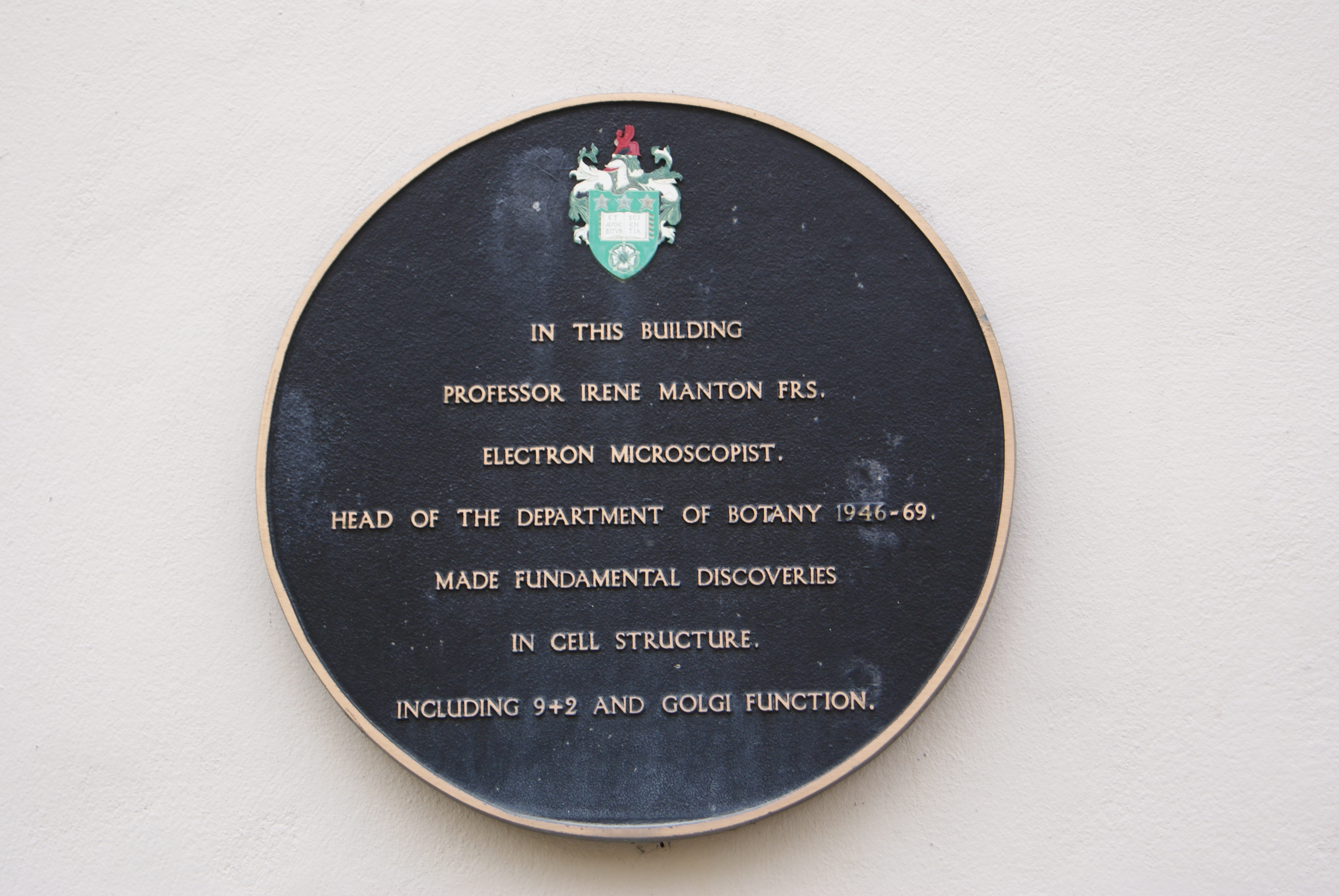
A plaque at the University of Leeds commemorating discoveries made by Manton at the University.

In 1990 the Irene Manton Prize for the best doctoral thesis in botany while registered at an academic institution in the UK was established by the Linnean Society.

The Linnean Society also sponsors annual Irene Manton Lectures at University of Manchester and University of Leeds that have been held since 2014.
At University of Manchester

- 2022 Rebecca Willis, University of Lancaster, Can democracy save us from climate change?
- 2021 Kat Coyte, University of Manchester, Worlds within our guts
- 2020 Eleanor Drinkwater, University of York, Metamorphosis: a 300 year story of intrepid women, rainforests and butterflies
- 2019 Jay Bradley, University of Nottingham, From man to mouse
- 2018 Sandy Knapp, President of the Linnean Society, Fieldwork in Fancy Dress
- 2017 Anna Gilchrist, University of Manchester, How butterflies move through Greater Manchester
- 2016 Sheena Cruickshank, University of Manchester, The body’s immune response to injury or infections such as parasitic worms
- 2015
- 2014 Dianne Edwards, President of the Linnean Society, Inaugural lecture entitled In the footsteps of Manton: Spores and early land plant evolution

At University of Leeds

- 2017 Jane Hill, University of York, Can we help species cope with climate change and habitat loss?
- 2016 Michelle Peckham, University of Leeds, A (scientific) life in imaging

In 1998, the tenth anniversary of her death, the Biological Sciences building at the University of Leeds was re-named the Irene Manton Building in her honour.

The British Phycological Society awards the Irène Manton prize annually for the best postgraduate student presentation at its annual scientific meeting.

The Manton Crater on the planet Venus is named after Irene Manton and her sister Sidnie, who was also a Fellow of the Royal Society.

Irene Manton's specimen collection is held by Leeds Museums and Galleries. It was transferred from the University of Leeds, along with the rest of the plant collection in 2015.

Irene Manton's archive is held by the University of Leeds. It contains correspondence, photographs, specimen slides, and material related to her life and research.

== Selected publications ==
Manton was author or co-author of over 140 scientific publications. Among the most significant were:

- Manton, I., Sutherland, J., Leadbeater, BSc. (1976) "Further observations on fine structure of marine collared flagellates (Choanoflagellata) from arctic Canada and West Greenland – species of Parviorbicula and Pleurasiga." Canadian J Botany – Revue Canadienne de Botanique, Vol 54, pp 1932–1955
- Parke, M., Green JG., Manton I. (1971) "Observations on fine structure of zoids of genus Phaeocystis [Haptophyceae]." Journal of the Marine Biological Association (UK), Vol 51, pp 927-
- Manton, I., Kowallik, K., Stosch, HAV. (1970) " Observations on fine structure and development of spindle at mitosis and meiosis in a marine centric diatom (Lithodesmium undulatum) 4. Second meiotic division and conclusion." J Cell Science, Vol 7, pp 407 –
- Manton, I., Leedale, GF. (1969) " Observations of microanatomy of Coccolithus pelagicus and Cricosphaera carterae with special reference to origin and nature of coccoliths and scales." Journal of the Marine Biological Association (UK), Vol 49, pp 1 –
- Provasol, L., Yamasu, T., Manton I. (1968) " Experiments on resynthesis of symbiosis in Convoluta roscoffensis with different flagellate cultures." Marine Biol Asscn (UK), Vol 48, pp 465 –
- Manton, I. (1965) " Observations on fine structure of 2 species of Platymonas with special reference to flagellar scales and mode of origin of theca." Journal of the Marine Biological Association (UK), Vol 45, pp 743 –
- Manton, I. (1964) " Observations on fine structure of zoospore and young germlings of Stigeoclonium." J. Exp. Botany, Vol 15, pp 399 –
- Manton, I. Parke, M. (1960) "Further observations on small green flagellates with special reference to possible relatives of Chromulina pusilla Butcher." Journal of the Marine Biological Association (UK), Vol 39, pp 275 –
- Parke, M., Manton, I., Clarke, B. (1955) "Studies on marine flagellates 2. 3 new species of Chrysochromulina." Journal of the Marine Biological Association (UK), Vol 34, pp 579 –
- Manton, I., Clarke, B. (1952) "An electron microscopic study of the spermatozoid of Sphagnum." J Exp. Botany, Vol 3, pp 265- DOI: 10.1093/jxb/3.3.265
- Manton, I., Clarke, B., Greenwood AD. (1951) "Observations with the electron microscope on a species of Saprolegnia." J. Exp. Botany, Vol 2, pp 321 –
- Manton, I. (1950) "The spiral structure of chromosomes." Biol Reviews Cambridge Philosophical Society, Vol 25, pp 486 – 508. DOI: 10.1111/j.1469-185X.1950.tb00770.x
- Manton, I. (1945) "New evidence on the telophase split in Todea barbara." American J. Botany, Vol 32, pp 342–348 DOI: 10.2307/2437168
- Manton, I. (1932) "Introduction to the general cytology of the Cruciferae." Annals of Botany, Vol 46, pp 509–556
- Manton, I. (1950) "Problems of Cytology and Evolution in the Pteridophyta." Cambridge Univ. Press, Cambridge, England.
