= Mary Gibby =

British botanist (1949–2024)

Mary Gibby OBE FLS FRSE
- Born: Mary Ambrose; 27 February 1949; Doncaster, South Yorkshire, England
- Died: 17 July 2024 (aged 75); The Alps, Italy
- Education: University of Leeds; University of Liverpool
- Scientific career
- Fields: Botany, cytology
- Workplaces: Natural History Museum, London; Royal Botanic Garden Edinburgh
- Thesis: A cytogenetic and taxonomic study of the Dryopteris carthusiana complex (1977)
- Doctoral advisor: Stanley Walker
- Author abbrev. (botany): Gibby

Professor Mary Gibby OBE FLS FRSE (27 February 1949 – 17 July 2024) was a British botanist, pteridologist and cytologist. She was an expert on ferns, becoming president of the British Pteridological Society and long-time editor of its journal, the Fern Gazette. Gibby particularly studied the cytology of the genera Dryopteris and Pelargonium.

== Early life and education ==
Gibby was born on 27 February 1949 in Doncaster, South Yorkshire, to Edgar and Sheila Ambrose (née Bickerton). Her father was a teacher and the family moved to Greysouthen when she was a child.

Gibby studied botany at the University of Leeds under Irene Manton and John Lovis, graduating with a first-class degree in 1971. During her undergraduate studies, she spent a summer as an intern at the Natural History Museum, London (NHM). She went on to study for a PhD on biosystematics and cytogenetics of the genus Dryopteris at the University of Liverpool under Stanley Walker.

== Career ==
In 1975, during the completion of her PhD, Gibby joined the botany department of the NHM. The NHM was still predominantly staffed by male scientists often without PhDs; Gibby recalled being asked if she would prefer to be called Mrs or Miss during one interview, replying 'Doctor will do'. As part of her work at the NHM, Gibby worked at the Chelsea Physic Garden, researching Pelargonium after meeting Virginia Nightingale, the garden's horticulturist who had a particular interest in the genus. She later worked with Alastair Culham on the evolutionary relationships within the genus.

Gibby's research on Dryopteris continued into the late 1980s but after attending a conference in the United States in 1991, she became more focused on Pelargonium, the filmy fern (Trichomanes speciosum), and European and Macaronesian Asplenium. She began using enzyme electrophoresis and chloroplast DNA sequencing to discover biogeographical patterns that allowed links between plant species to be confirmed or rejected much more easily.

From 1997 to 2000, Gibby was the Associate Keeper of the NHM's Botany Department. In 2000, she joined the Royal Botanic Garden Edinburgh (RBGE) as Director of Science. According to her Guardian obituary, this made her the "highest serving woman" in the institution's 350-year history. Gibby said that the move shifted her research focus towards conservation issues. In the role, she worked with the University of Edinburgh, the Scottish Crop Research Institute, Scottish Natural Heritage, and helped to develop the first versions of the Scottish Biodiversity Strategy.

Gibby was made a Fellow of the Royal Society of Edinburgh in 2005. In 2009, Gibby was part of the restoration of the fernery at Benmore Botanic Garden, helping to direct the replanting after the building had been restored the previous year. She wrote a book, The Benmore Fernery: Celebrating the World of Ferns, about the project. She was elected president of the British Pteridological Society, taking up the post in April 2010 and serving until April 2013. Gibby had also edited the society's journal Fern Gazette since 2002, and continued to do so until her death in 2024.

Gibby was made a member of the Darwin Expert Committee, an advisory group to the UK Department for Environment, Food and Rural Affairs, in 2009; in 2012, she was reappointed for a second three-year term by environment secretary Caroline Spelman. Gibby was awarded an OBE in the 2010 New Year Honours for services to botany.

Gibby retired in 2012 but continued to work at the NHM London and RBGE as a research associate, collections curator and teacher. In 2014, she presented evidence to the Science and Technology Committee of the House of Commons on the funding of the Royal Botanic Gardens Kew, representing the UK Plant Sciences Federation.

== Personal life and death ==
Gibby married Mike Gibby, a fellow botany student at university, before they later divorced. She went on to marry John Barrett, a theoretical plant geneticist working at Cambridge University, with whom she had a daughter; Barrett died in 2004. Gibby married Janis Antonovics in 2015.

Gibby was also a canal and narrowboat enthusiast; she owned and restored a narrowboat called Swan that had been built in 1933 and enjoyed spending time on it. She was a member of the boat community at Battlebridge Basin in London and was director of a narrowboat company from 2014 to 2020.

Gibby died on 17 July 2024 during a fieldwork trip in the Italian Alps with her husband.
