= Isabella Gordon =

Scottish carcinologist

Isabella Gordon DSc OBE FZS FLS
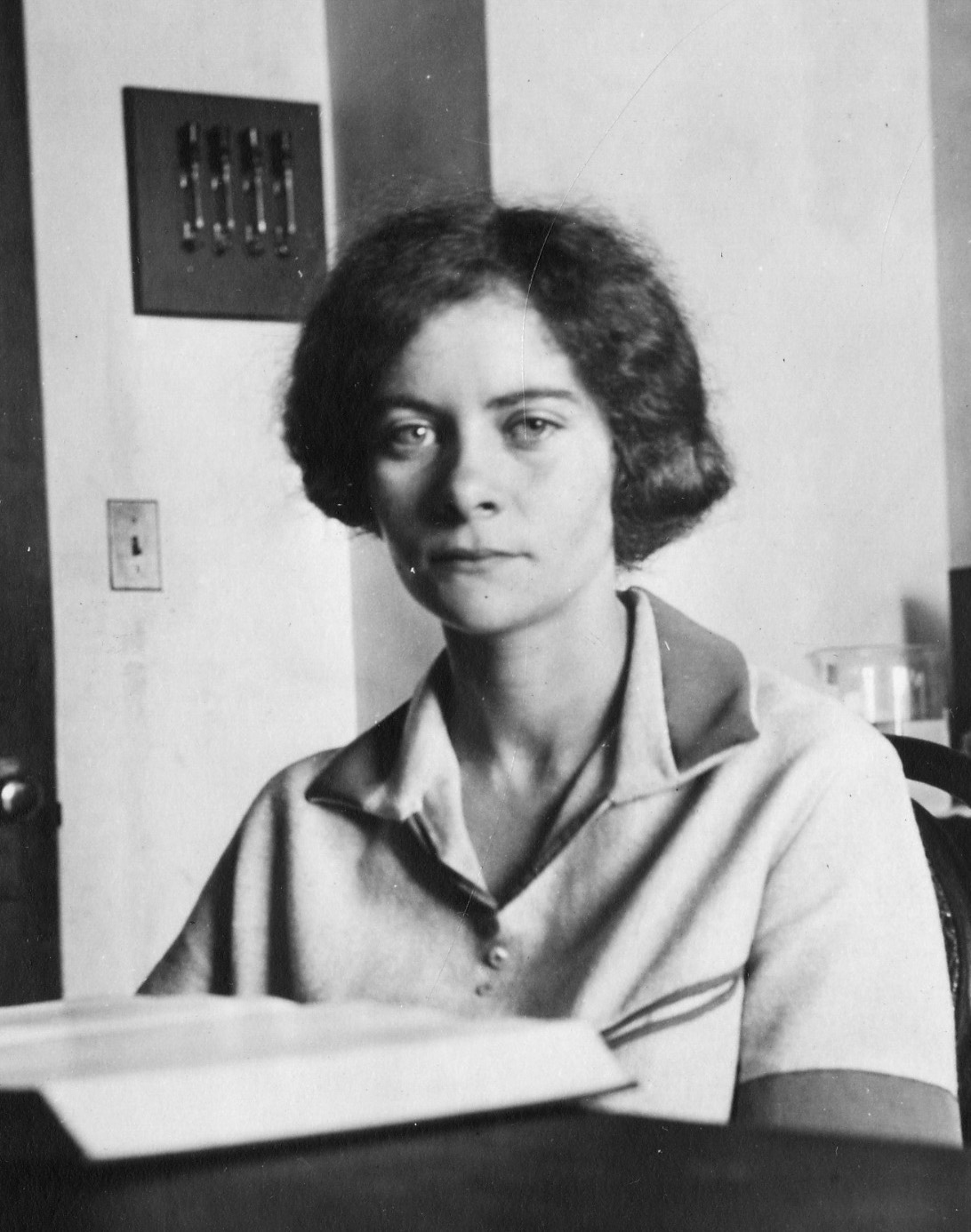
- Born: 18 May 1901; Keith (Moray), Scotland
- Died: 11 May 1988 (aged 86); Carlisle, England
- Education: University of Aberdeen; Imperial College
- Known for: carcinology
- Scientific career
- Workplaces: Natural History Museum

Isabella Gordon OBE FZS FLS (18 May 1901 – 11 May 1988) was a Scottish marine biologist who specialised in carcinology and was an expert in crabs and sea spiders. She worked at the Natural History Museum and received an OBE in 1961.

== Early life and education ==
Gordon was born in Keith, Scotland on 18 May 1901, the eldest child of Margaret (née Lamb) and James Gordon. She attended Keith Grammar School before going to the University of Aberdeen in 1918. As she had limited funds to support her education she took positions as a student demonstrator in zoology. She graduated from the University with BSc in zoology. She also completed training in primary and science teaching at Aberdeen Teachers' Training College. In 1923 she was awarded the Kilgour Research Scholarship and studied alcyonaria. She then took up postgraduate research scholarship at Imperial College which led to her PhD in the embryology of end echinoderms. She continued her research into echinoderms in the United States at both the Hopkins Marine Station of Stanford University and Yale University. In 1928 she received a DSc from the University of Aberdeen.

== Employment and professional associations ==
While at Yale University William Thomas Calman, Keeper of Zoology at the Natural History Museum, London, offered her a post at the museum. She returned to the UK and in November 1928 took up the position of Assistant Keeper (2nd class) with responsibility for the Crustacea section. Gordon was the first woman to be appointed as a full-time permanent member of museum staff. In 1937 the Crustacea section was split into two parts; J.P. Harding took over entomostraca while Gordon managed malacostraca as Principal Scientific Officer. During her time at the museum she published many articles and books and identified specimens of crabs sent to her from all over the world.

She was a fellow and council member (1950-1953) of the Linnean Society and a member of its curatorial board until her resignation in 1981. She was also a fellow of the Zoological Society. In 1960 she became one of the original members of the Editorial Board of the peer-reviewed journal Crustaceana.

== Visit to Japan and meeting with Hirohito ==
In April 1961 on the occasion of Emperor Hirohito's 60th birthday, Gordon was invited to spend several weeks in Japan under the sponsorship of the Japanese newspaper Yomiuri Shimbun. On 5 April she was invited to the laboratories of the Imperial Household where she had an informal audience with the Emperor, a keen marine biologist himself. The visit gave Gordon great pleasure and she retained contact with her Japanese colleagues for the rest of her life.

== Humour and limericks ==
Gordon had a great sense of humour and was a fan of limericks. In 1958 she published a review of Siewing's 'Anatomie und Histologie von Thermosbaena mirabilis' under the title 'A thermophilous shrimp from Tunisia'. The title inspired Dr A.J. Bateman to send her the following limerick:

A thermophilous shrimp from Tunisia
said: when it gets cold I get busier
I dig a hole
And fill it with coal
and there's nowhere as warmer as it is 'ere

To which she replied

The idea's OK but Aplysia
Is the rhyme I should choose for Tunysia
A purist and Scot
I simply could not
pronounce it to rhyme with 'it is 'ier-r-r !!

== Later life ==
She retired from the Natural History Museum in 1966 and retained a room in the Crustacea section, which she shared with Dr Sidnie Manton, and continued to work in the museum until about 1971. In 1983 she suffered a stroke which left her partially paralysed. In 1987 she moved from London to live with the family of her nephew Dr John Gordon in Carlisle. Her health deteriorated after a cataract operation in March 1988 and she died on 11 May 1988.

In her obituary the Dutch carcinologist, Lipke Holthuis referred to her as The Grand Old Lady of Carcinology.
