= British Pteridological Society =

The British Pteridological Society is for fern enthusiasts of the British Isles, and was founded in England in 1891.

The origins and early history of the BPS at the time of "Pteridomania" is described in the book The Victorian Fern Craze. The BPS celebrated its centenary in 1991; amongst other things, it was marked by the publication of the book, A World of Ferns.

The British Pteridological Society is a registered charity: No. 1092399. The BPS has as its Patron King Charles III.

== Publications ==
The British Pteridological Society publishes a number of works, which promote pteridology:

- The Fern Gazette
- The Pteridologist
- The Bulletin

== Presidents of the Society ==
John A. Wilson (1831-1914) was elected Chairman of the Society at the first meeting in 1891; subsequently Dr. F.W. Stansfield was invited to become the first President of the Society. He took office in 1892.

President	Term
Frederick Wilson Stansfield (1854-1937)	1892-1897, 1902-1904, 1907-1908
Charles Thomas Druery (1843-1917)	1898-1901
William Henry Phillips (1830-1923)	1904-1907
James J. Smithies (c.1850-1931)	1908-1909
Alex Cowan (1863-1943)	1909-1920
William Bathgate Cranfield (1859-1948)	1920-1948
Robert Bolton (c.1869-1949)	1948-1949
Arthur Hugh Garfit Alston (1902-1958)	1949-1958
Thomas H. Bolton (1899-1972)	1958-1960
Richard Eric Holttum (1895-1990)	1960-1963
Reginald Kaye (1902-1992)	1963-1966
James Davidson (c.1896-1985)	1966-1969
Irene Manton (1904-1988)	1969-1972
Henry L. Schollick (1906-1991)	1972-1975
Stanley Walker (1924-1985)	1975-1979
James Wood Dyce (1905-1996)	1979-1982
Anthony Clive Jermy (1932-2014)	1982-1985
Gwladys Tonge (1920-2017)	1985-1988
Barry A. Thomas	1988-1991
Jack Henry Bouckley (1919-2013)	1991-1994
Trevor George Walker (1927-2006)	1994-1997
Martin H. Rickard	1997-2001
Alastair C. Wardlaw	2001-2004
Adrian F. Dyer	2004-2007
Robert W. Sykes	2007-2010
Mary Gibby	2010-2013
John A. Edgington	2013-2016
Fred Rumsey	2016-2019
Alison Evans	2019-2022
Rob Cooke	2022-2025
Barry Wright	2025-
