= J. P. Harding =

British zoologist

John Philip Harding
- Born: 12 November 1911; Rondebosch, Cape Town, South Africa
- Died: 14 July 1998 (aged 86)
- Education: University College, Exeter
- Occupation: Keeper of Zoology--Natural History Museum

John Philip Harding (12 November 1911 – 14 July 1998) was a British zoologist, specialising in the Crustacea. He went to Torquay Grammar School, followed by university at University College, Exeter, University of Cincinnati and King's College, Cambridge. He worked first for a year as an assistant naturalist in the Ministry of Agriculture and Fisheries. He joined the staff in 1937 at the Natural History Museum, London, specialising in what at the time was known as the Entomostraca crustaceans, and progressing to Keeper of Zoology from 1954 to 1971.

He was the first member of staff of the Natural History Museum to work extensively on copepods, part of the Entomostraca section, and is listed as authority for 34 copepod species. Harding studied both free-living and parasitic forms, but he also published on barnacles, cladocerans, clam shrimp, anostracans and ostracods, thereby maintaining the generalist tradition in the Museum. After retirement, he became visiting professor at Westfield College, London from 1971 until 1977.

In 1937 he married Sidnie Manton; they had a daughter Elizabeth (born 1939) and a son, Martyn. His photograph by Bassano is available in the National Portrait Gallery.
