= Sidney Frederic Harmer =

British zoologist

Sir Sidney Frederic Harmer, KBE, FRS (9 March 1862 – 22 October 1950) was a British zoologist. He was superintendent of the Cambridge University Museum of Zoology (1892–1908) and then the Keeper of Zoology (1909–1921) and director (1919–1927) of the Natural History Museum in London. His research focused on taxonomy of invertebrates and Cetacea. He was an elected fellow of the Royal Society (1898), and served as president of the Linnean Society (1927–1931), receiving the Linnean Medal (1934).

== Biography ==
Sidney Harmer was born in 1862, the son of Frederic William Harmer, a Norwich wool merchant and amateur geologist, who served as the city's mayor (1887–88). Sidney Harmer was educated at Amersham Hall school, near Reading, and then University College London (BSc 1880) and King's College, Cambridge, where he graduated with a first in both parts of the natural sciences tripos (1884), and was later awarded an Sc.D. (1897).

He remained at Cambridge after graduating, and became university lecturer in advanced invertebrate morphology (1885), with a fellowship at King's College (1886), where he was also assistant tutor (1890). From 1892 to 1908, he was Superintendent of the Cambridge University Museum of Zoology.

In 1908 he was appointed Keeper of Zoology at the Natural History Museum in London (1909–1921) and was director of the Museum from 1919 to 1927. He continued to research at the museum after his retirement as director.

His research focused on invertebrate taxonomy, particularly Polyzoa. He also investigated how to protect museum specimens from fading in colour. He published on Cetacea, including cetaceans stranded on the British coast, the whaling industry, and tracing whale migration by marking individual whales. His research library is held in the National Marine Biological Library at the Marine Biological Association in Plymouth.

== Family ==
In 1891, Harmer married Laura Russell Howell, an alumna of the natural science tripos at the University of Cambridge. She had been a demonstrator in animal morphology at the Balfour Biological Laboratory for Women there. They had four children, including Russell Harmer, the gold medal-winning British sailor, and Iris Mary Harmer, who married the pharmacologist John Gaddum.

== Awards, honours and societies ==
He was made KBE in the 1920 civilian war honours. He was elected a fellow of the Royal Society in 1898, and served as vice-president of the society in 1922–24. He was President of the Linnean Society 1927–1931 and was awarded the Linnean Medal in 1934.

== Selected publications ==
- On the structure and development of Loxosoma. 1885.
- On the life-history of Pedicellina. 1886.
- On the British species of Crisia. 1891.
- as editor with Sir Arthur Shipley: Cambridge Natural History, series published 1895–. London: Macmillan & Co.
- Hemichordata. Cambridge Natural History. Vol. 7. 1910.
- with Richard Lydekker: Guide to the whales, porpoises, and dolphins (order Cetacea), exhibited in the Department of zoology, British museum (Natural history) (2nd ed.). Printed by order of the Trustees. 1922.
