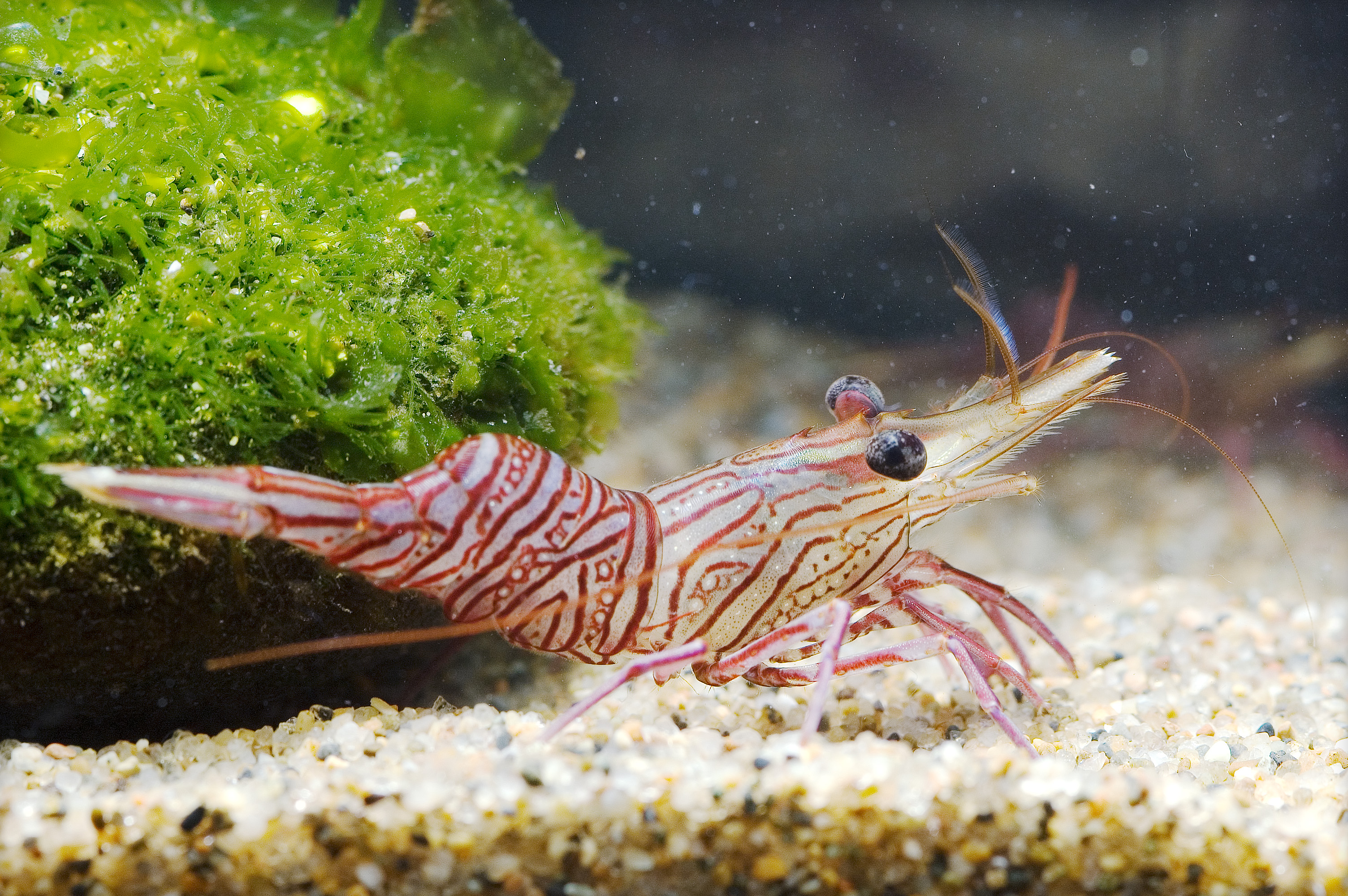

Scientific classification
- Kingdom: Animalia
- Phylum: Arthropoda
- Class: Malacostraca
- Order: Decapoda
- Suborder: Pleocyemata
- Infraorder: Caridea
- Family: Rhynchocinetidae
- Genus: Rhynchocinetes
- Species: R. uritai

Binomial name
- Rhynchocinetes uritai Kubo, 1942

= Rhynchocinetes uritai =

Species of crustacean

Rhynchocinetes uritai also known as the camel shrimp, camelback shrimp, or dancing shrimp is a non-aggressive crustacean of the family Rhynchocinetidae. They are saltwater shrimp, and are common in saltwater aquariums.

== Description ==
The camel shrimp is a hardy saltwater shrimp, It is covered with red and white stripes that run across its entire body. R. uritai has a movable rostrum or beak that is generally facing upwards. Male camel shrimp have larger chelipeds or claw compared to the female camel shrimp. The claw is formed when the shrimp reaches maturity.

== Ecology ==
Rhynchocinetes uritai is found under cracks and crevasses, coral deposits, and rock caves because those habitats provide safe cover from predators. They are often seen with other camel shrimp in their habitat.

The common predators of Rhynchocinetes uritai are herring, salmon, sculpin and flatfishes.

Rhynchocinetes uritai is a carnivorous shrimp and it feeds on detritus, phytoplankton, zooplankton, and frozen or freeze-dried bits of seafood. In captivity, camel shrimp will accept a varied diet of prepared fresh and frozen foods suitable for carnivores, examples of this are: vitamin enriched flakes, freeze dried krill, or live adult brine shrimp or nauplii.

== Behaviour ==
Camel shrimp are carnivores feeding on plankton, and other small meats, they look for food by plowing through the sand, separating food, and sand particles, this behavior improves the aquarium environment at the same time due to the fact that they are aerating it. As the shrimp grows it needs to undergo a moulting process which replaces its old exoskeleton with a harder new one, the shrimp may molt several times during its life. Camel shrimp has a tendency to damage soft corals, and anemones. Like most shrimp, it is nocturnal and usually hides during daylight hours, coming out at night to feed.
