= King's Cross, London =

Area of central London in England

Coordinates: 51.5303°N 0.1236°W

King's Cross
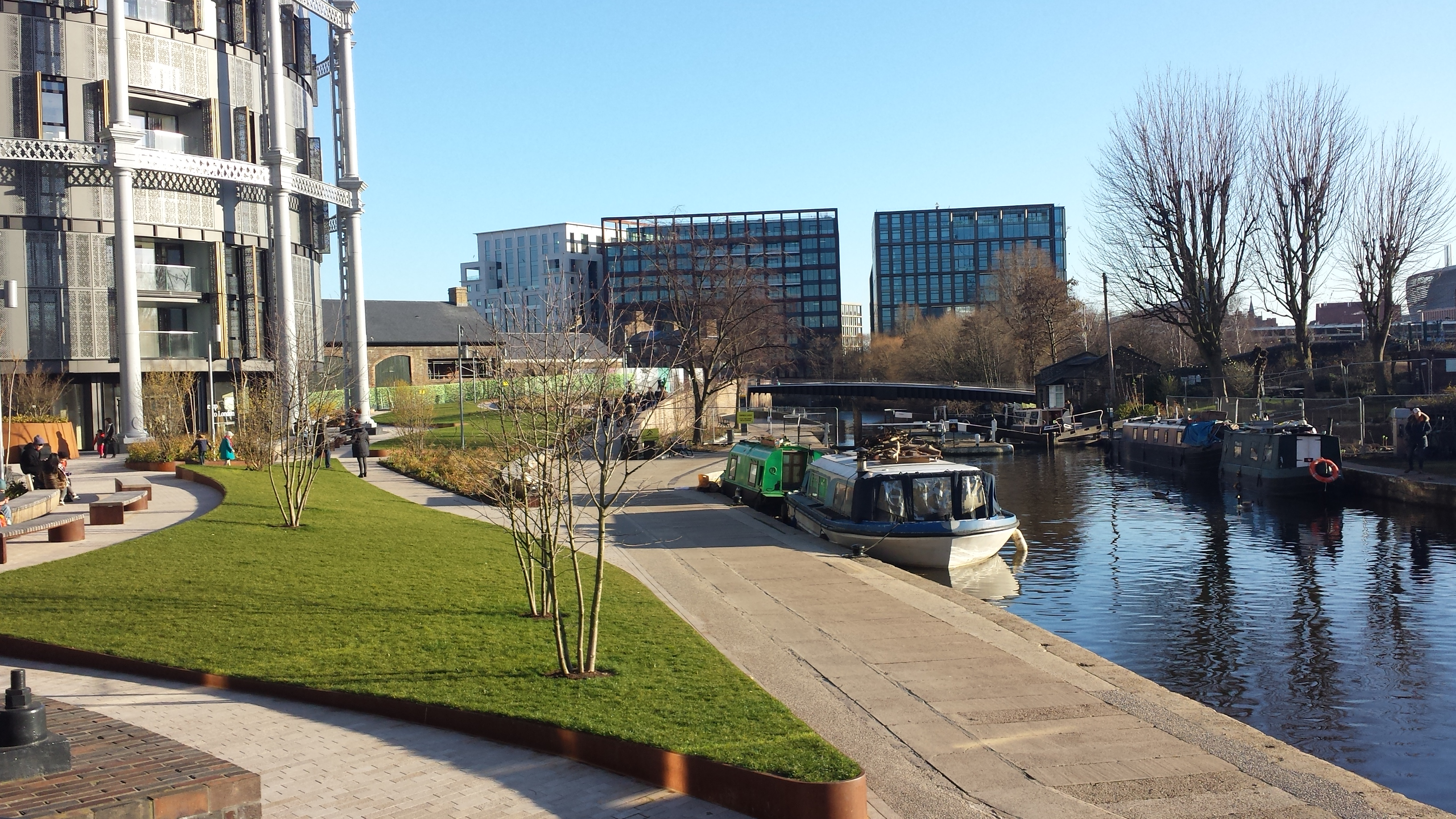
- Repurposed gas holders and canal locks at King's Cross, with the buildings of St Pancras Square behind

- Location within Greater London
- Population: 11,843 (2011)
- OS grid reference: TQ304827
- London borough: Camden; Islington
- Ceremonial county: Greater London
- Region: London
- Country: England
- Sovereign state: United Kingdom
- Post town: LONDON
- Postcode district: N1, N1C
- Postcode district: NW1
- Postcode district: WC1
- Dialling code: 020
- Police: Metropolitan
- Fire: London
- Ambulance: London
- UK Parliament: Holborn and St Pancras Islington South and Finsbury
- London Assembly: Barnet and Camden; North East
- Website: www.kingscross.co.uk

King's Cross is a district in the London boroughs of Camden and Islington, on either side of Euston Road in north London, England, 1.5 miles (2.4 km) north of Charing Cross, bordered by Barnsbury to the north, Clerkenwell to the south-east, Angel to the east, Holborn and Bloomsbury to the south, Somers Town to the west and Camden Town to the north-west. It is served by two major rail termini, St Pancras and King's Cross. King's Cross station is the terminus of one of the major rail routes between London and the North.

The area, which was historically the south-eastern part of the parish and borough of St Pancras, and once known for drug-dealing and prostitution, has undergone significant regeneration since the mid-1990s. The introduction of the Eurostar rail service at St Pancras International and the rebuilding of King's Cross station helped stimulate the redevelopment of the long-derelict railway lands to the north of the termini.

== History ==
=== Origin ===
The area, historically the south-eastern part of the ancient parish and subsequent Metropolitan Borough of St Pancras, was previously known as Battle Bridge or Battlebridge after an ancient crossing of the River Fleet. The original name of the bridge was Broad Ford Bridge. The original parish church, St Pancras Old Church, located behind the stations, was built on a knoll on the west bank of the Fleet, and is believed to be one of the oldest Christian sites in Britain.

=== Boudica legend ===
The corruption "Battle Bridge" led to a tradition that this was the site of a major battle in AD 60 or 61 between the Romans and the Iceni tribe led by Boudica (also known as Boadicea). The tradition claims support from the writing of Publius Cornelius Tacitus, an ancient Roman historian, who described the place of action between the Romans and Boudica (Annals 14.31), but without specifying where it was; Thornbury addresses the pros and cons of the identification. Lewis Spence's 1937 book Boadicea – warrior queen of the Britons includes a map showing the supposed positions of the opposing armies. The suggestion that Boudica is buried beneath platform 9 or 10 at King's Cross station seems to have arisen as urban folklore since the end of World War II. The area had been settled in Roman times, and a camp here known as The Brill was erroneously attributed to Julius Caesar, who never visited Londinium. There is still a small area named "Battle Bridge Place" between King's Cross and St Pancras stations, and "Brill Place", a road leading towards Euston from St Pancras station. An art installation named the Identified Flying Object (IFO) stands in Battle Bridge Place, part of the RELAY King's Cross Arts programme.

=== Development and the name "King's Cross" ===
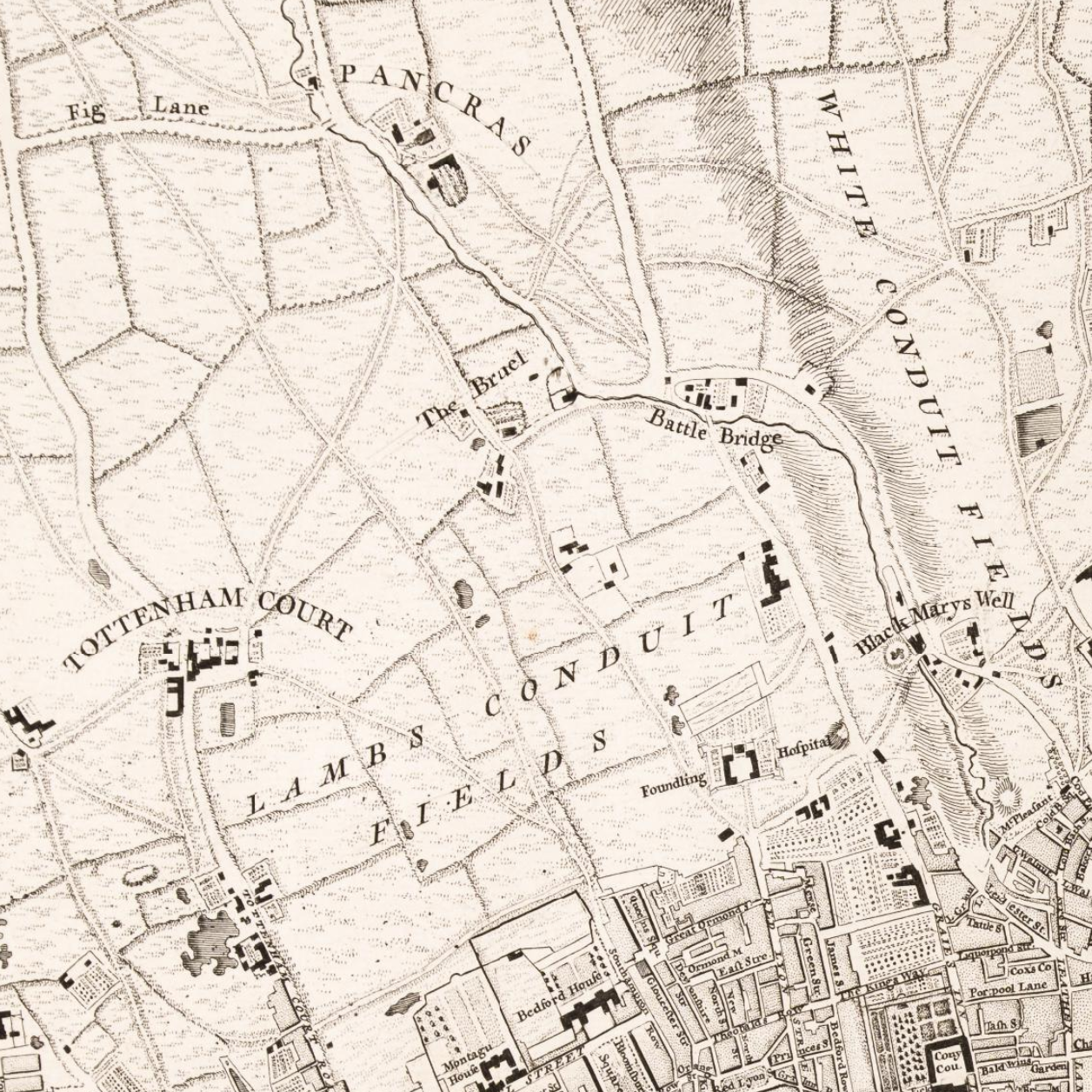
The countryside north of Bloomsbury and Holborn, with the hamlets of St Pancras and Battle Bridge, on John Rocque's map of London (1746)

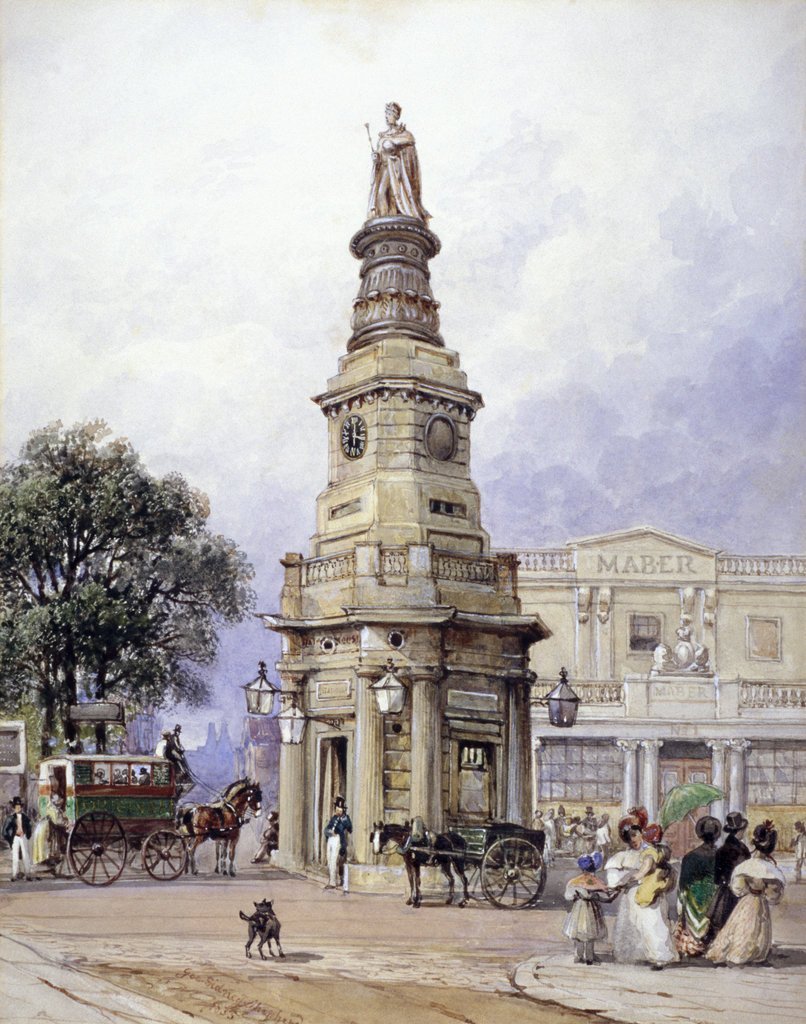
The 19th century monument to George IV, since demolished, that gave the area its name

The Rocque map of 1746 shows the area as entirely undeveloped; however, the opening of the new Euston Road (originally New Road) in 1756 opened the area up for development. The current name has its origin in a monument to King George IV which stood from 1830 to 1845 at "the king's crossroads" where New Road (later Euston Road), Gray's Inn Road, and Pentonville Road met. The monument was sixty feet (18 m) high and topped by an eleven-foot-high (3.4 m) statue of the king; it was described by Walter Thornbury as "a ridiculous octagonal structure crowned by an absurd statue". The statue itself, which cost no more than £25, was constructed of bricks and mortar, and finished in a manner that gave it the appearance of stone "at least to the eyes of common spectators". The architect was Stephen Geary, who exhibited a model of "the Kings Cross" at the Royal Academy in 1830. The upper storey was used as a camera obscura while the base housed first a police station, and later a public house. The unpopular building was demolished in 1845, though the area kept the name of King's Cross. A structure in the form of a lighthouse was built on top of a building almost on the site about 30 years later. Known locally as the "Lighthouse Building", the structure was popularly thought to be an advertisement for Netten's Oyster Bar on the ground floor, but this seems not to be true. It is a Grade II listed building.

=== Railway stations ===
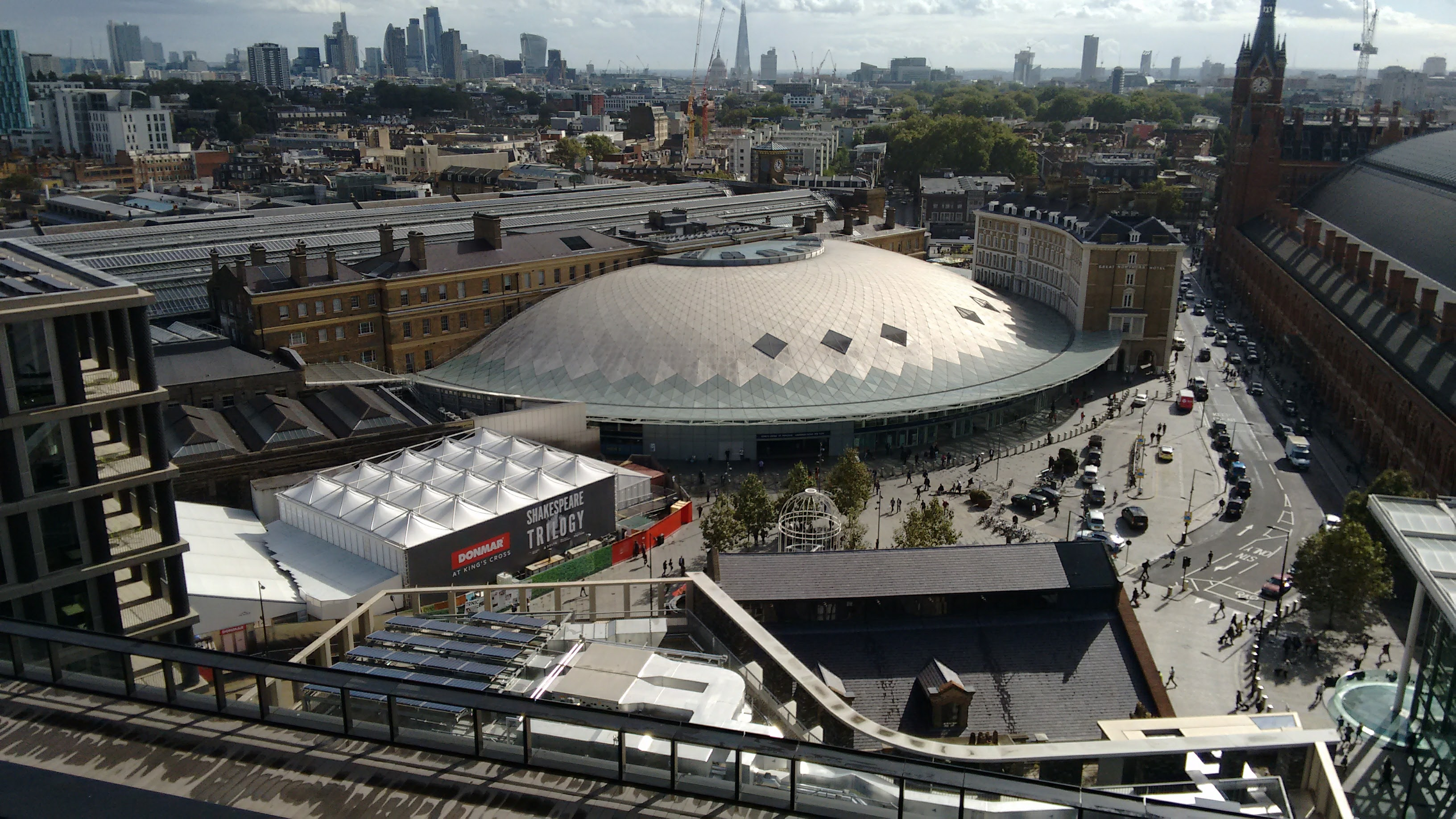
Aerial view of the area surrounding King's Cross station

King's Cross station now stands by the junction where the monument stood and took its name. The station, designed by architect Lewis Cubitt and opened in 1852, succeeded a temporary earlier station, erected north of the canal in time for the Great Exhibition of 1851.

St Pancras railway station, built by the Midland Railway, lies immediately to the west. They both had extensive land ("the railway lands") to house their associated facilities for handling general goods and specialist commodities such as fish, coal, potatoes and grain. The passenger stations on Euston Road far outweighed in public attention the economically more important goods traffic to the north. King's Cross and St Pancras stations, and indeed all London railway stations, made an important contribution to the capital's economy.

=== Post-war decline ===
After World War II the area declined from being a poor but busy industrial and distribution services district to a partially abandoned post-industrial district. By the 1980s it was notorious for prostitution and drug abuse. This reputation impeded attempts to revive the area, using the large amount of land available following the decline of the railway goods yard to the north of the station and the many other vacant premises in the area. The King's Cross fire in 1987 in which 31 people died as a result of poor maintenance and safety procedures in the district's major Tube station only typified the level of dilapidation and neglect present in the area.

Relatively cheap rents and a central London location made the area attractive to artists and designers and both Antony Gormley and Thomas Heatherwick established studios in the area. In the late 1980s, a group of musicians, mechanics, and squatters from Hammersmith called Mutoid Waste Company moved into Battlebridge Road warehouse. They built huge industrial sculptures out of scrap metal and held raves. In 1989 they were evicted by police. In 1992, the Community Creation Trust took over the disused coach repair depot and built it into the largest Ecology Centre in Europe with ecohousing for homeless youngsters, The Last Platform Cafe, London Ecology Centre (after its demise in Covent Garden), offices and workshops, gardens and ponds. It was destroyed to make a car park for the Channel Tunnel Regeneration. Bagley's Warehouse was a nightclub venue in the 1990s warehouse rave scene on the site of Goods Yard behind King's Cross stations, now part of the redevelopment area known as the Coal Drops adjacent to Granary Square.

=== Regeneration ===
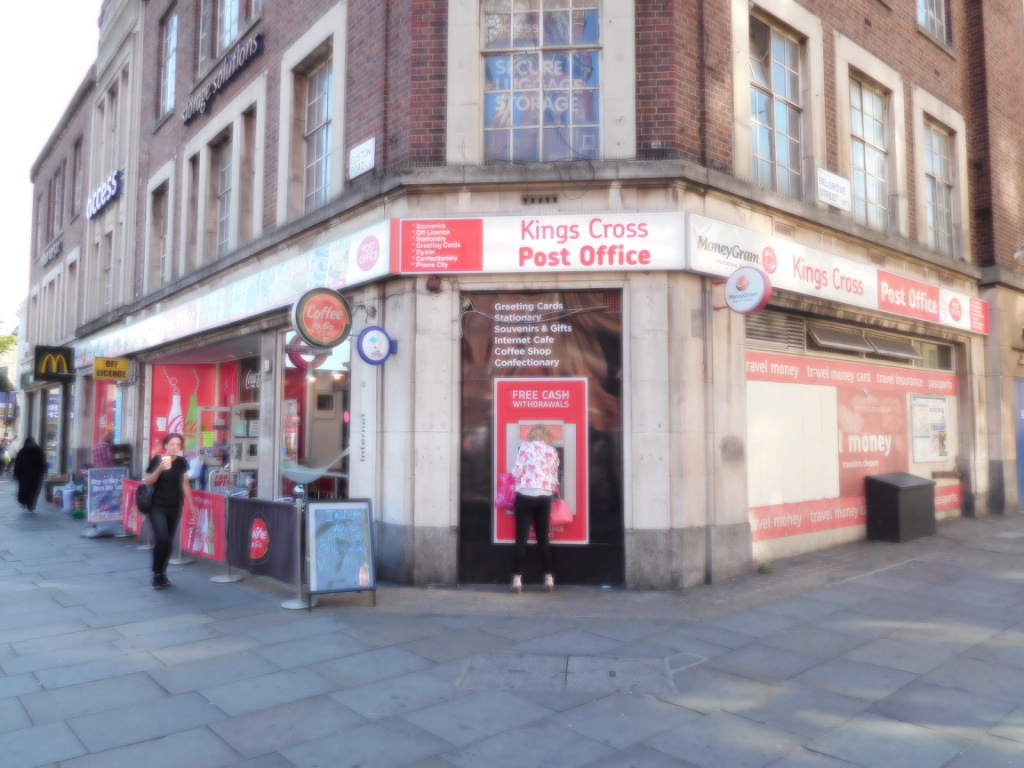
King's Cross Post Office in King's Cross, London

In the 1990s, the government established the King's Cross Partnership to fund regeneration projects, and the commencement of work on High Speed 1 in 2000 provided a major impetus for other projects. In 2001, Argent was selected as the development partner. The London terminus of the Eurostar international rail services to Paris and Brussels moved to St Pancras station in November 2007.

Following the opening of the High Speed 1 to the station, redevelopment of the land between the two major stations and the old King's Cross railway lands to the rear commenced. In 2008, Argent, London & Continental Railways and DHL formed a joint partnership: Kings Cross Central Limited Partnership. Outline planning permission, prepared by Allies and Morrison and Porphyrios Associates, was granted for the whole site in 2006. Detailed planning applications for each part of the site are being made on a rolling programme basis.

The area remains a major focus of redevelopment in the second decade of the 21st century. In 2017, Google, which already occupied a large building between St. Pancras and King's Cross stations, submitted plans for a £1 billion building stretching along the west side of King's Cross station towards the Regents canal.

The area has also been for many years home to a number of trades union head offices (including the NUJ, RMT, UNISON, NUT, Community and UCU).

=== Education, culture and heritage ===
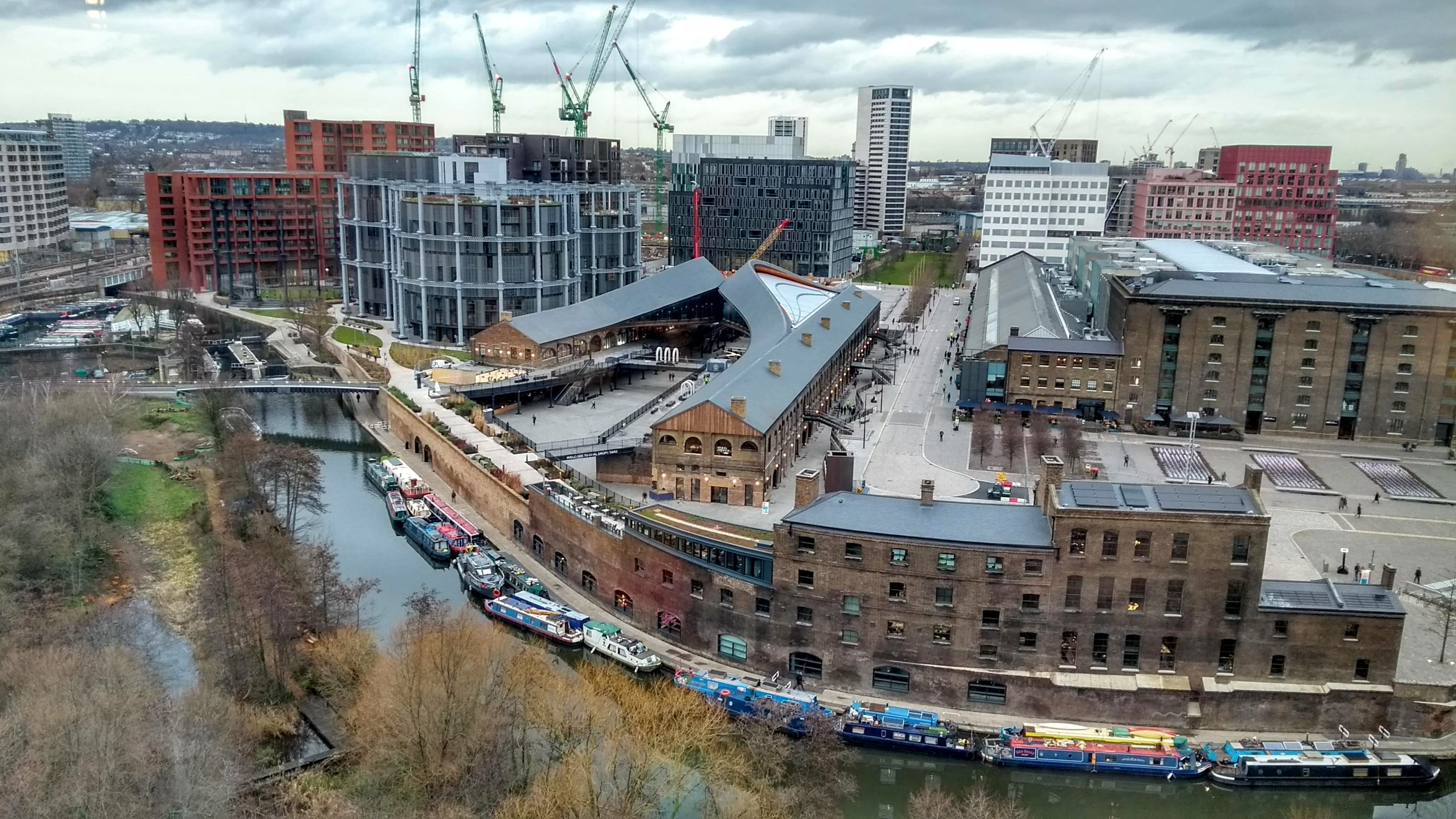
Canalside regeneration at King's Cross has seen many modern buildings erected, together with the preservation of most heritage assets.

The area has increasingly become home to cultural establishments. The London Canal Museum opened in 1992, and in 1997 a new home for the British Library opened next to St Pancras station. There was a small theatre, the Courtyard, that closed in late 2006 as a result of the gentrification of the area caused by a number of regeneration projects there, in this case, Regent's Quarter, across the boundary in Islington. The Gagosian Gallery moved their main London premises to the area in 2004. The London Sinfonietta and the Orchestra of the Age of Enlightenment are based in Kings Place, on Battlebridge Basin next to the Regent's Canal. King's Place is also the home of The Guardian and The Observer newspapers, and of the UK Drug Policy Commission.

In September 2011 the University of the Arts London moved to the Granary Complex. A whole series of new public squares and gardens have opened, among them Granary Square with its spectacular fountains, Lewis Cubitt Park and Square and the new Gasholder Park.

The station's redevelopment led to the demolition of several buildings, including the Gasworks.

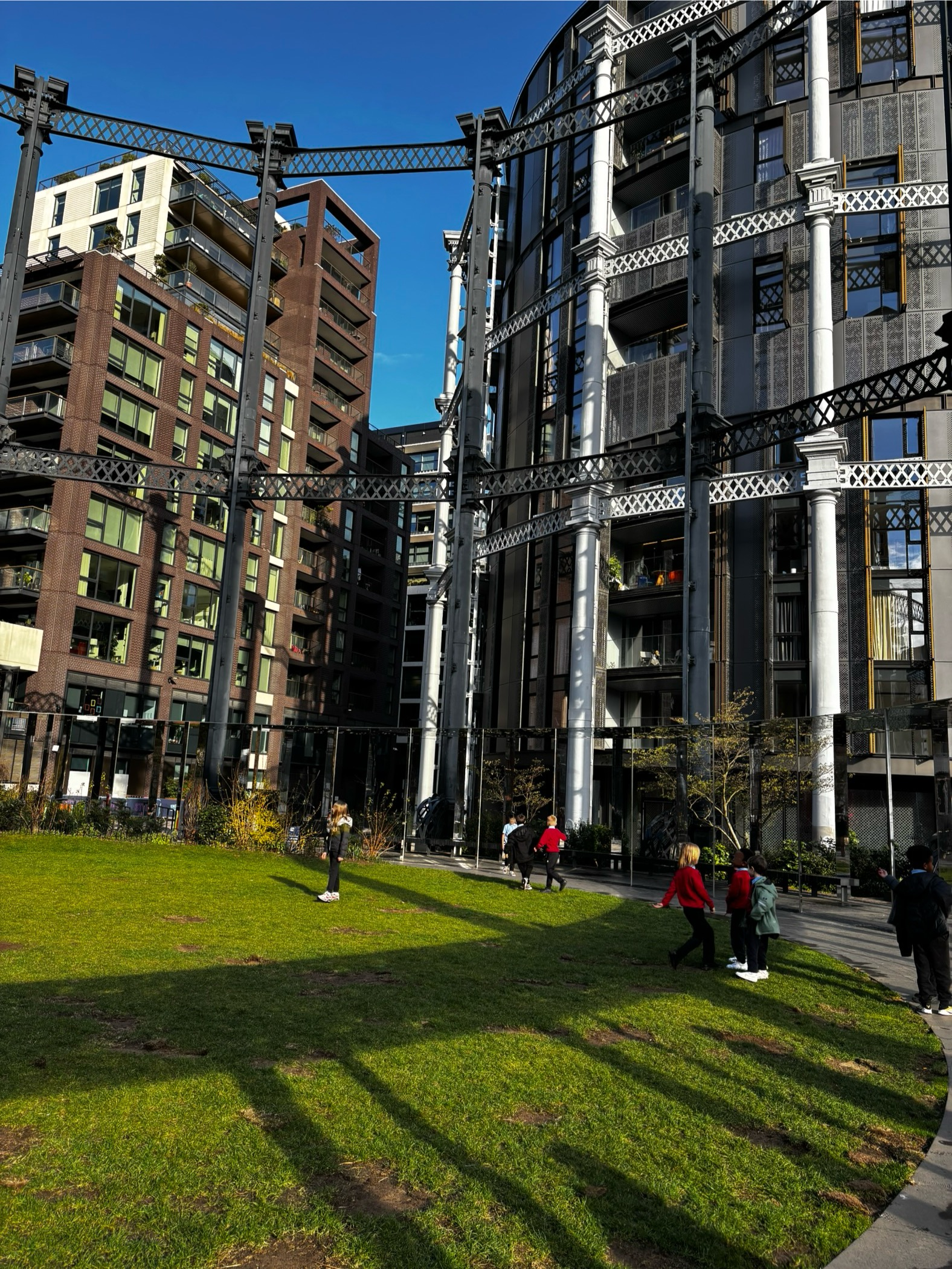
Gasholder Park in Kings Cross, London

== Location ==
King's Cross forms the south-east part of the ancient parish and subsequent borough of St Pancras, which is now the major part of the London Borough of Camden. The importance of King's Cross station means the area can be considered as partially lying within both the boroughs of Camden and neighbouring Islington.

The eastern boundary of the parish and borough of St Pancras has become the boundary of the larger modern borough and is locally formed, in part, by the course of the River Fleet. The southern boundary of the parish and borough ran along Guilford Street and in places slightly further south where, on the north side of Long Yard and along Roger Street, it followed the course of a now-culverted tributary of the Fleet, a tributary which was historically dammed to form Lamb's Conduit.

The London Borough of Camden has an electoral ward called King's Cross.

== In popular culture ==
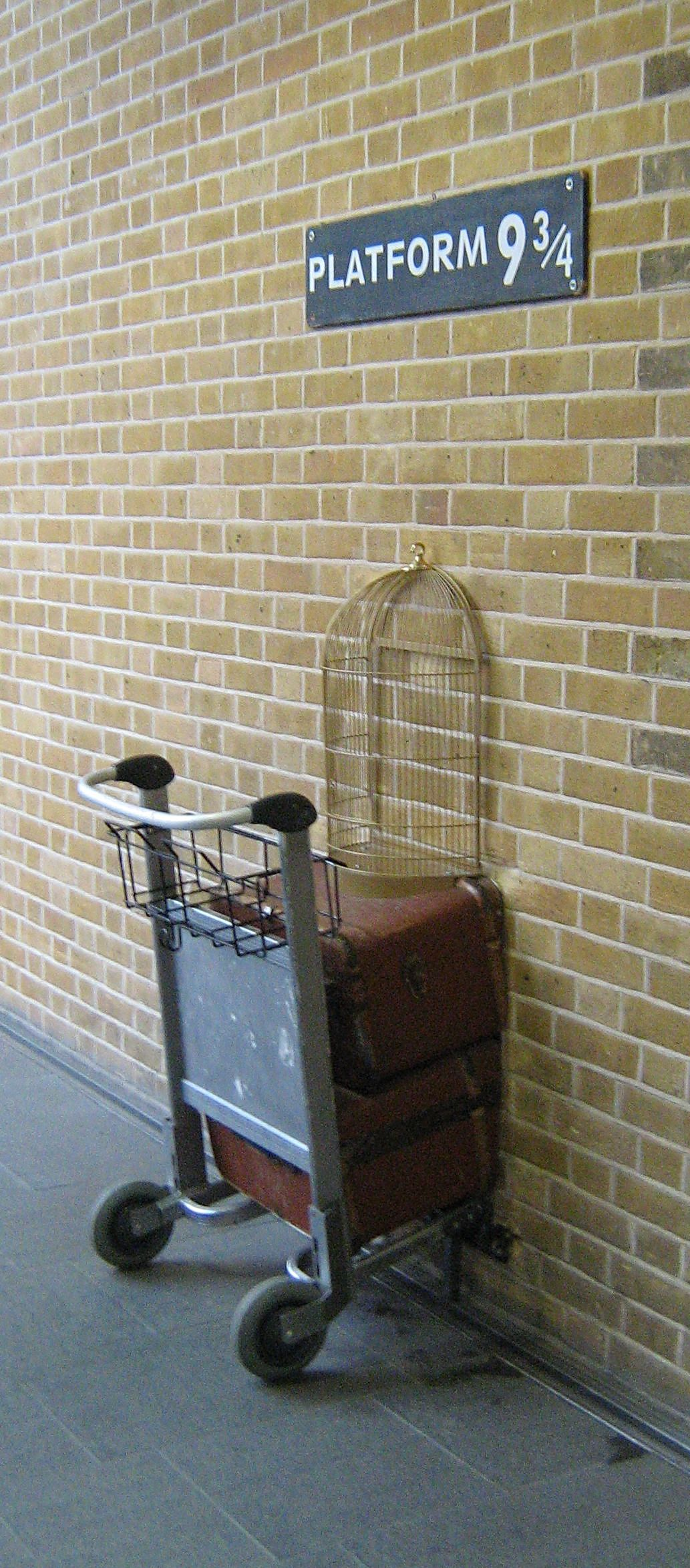
The Platform 9 3/4 sign at King's Cross station

In the Harry Potter stories, King's Cross station is where the protagonist boards the train for Hogwarts. However, author JK Rowling later admitted she had confused it with nearby Euston station. The railway station has put up a sign for the fictional "Platform 9 3/4" described in the books, and embedded part of a luggage trolley halfway into the wall. Film adaptations have used platforms 4 and 5, with the nearby St Pancras station and hotel acting as exteriors.

King's Cross and its surrounding streets were the setting for the 1955 Ealing comedy The Ladykillers, two British drama films starring Max Bygraves—A Cry from the Streets (1958) and Spare the Rod (1961)—and Mike Leigh's High Hopes (1988). Anthony Minghella's 2006 film Breaking and Entering is also set in King's Cross.

In 1972 it was the setting for Kings Cross Lunch Hour, one of four plays set in different parts of London, written by John Mortimer for the BBC drama series Thirty-Minute Theatre.

"Vale Royal", an epic poem in 700 triads by Aidan Andrew Dun, probes into this zone of London; "Vale Royal" was launched at the Albert Hall in 1995. A triad of Dun's, excerpted from another poem, "The Brill", has been installed at the western end of Granary Square in a small grove of trees beside the new Central Saint Martins. It reads: "Kings Cross, dense with angels and histories, there are cities beneath your pavements, cities behind your skies. Let me see!"

The Irish rock group the Pogues was founded in King's Cross.

The British pop music duo Pet Shop Boys recorded a song featured on their 1987 album Actually named "King's Cross": the melancholy track discusses the hopelessness of the AIDS epidemic during that time and uses the King's Cross area as the "backdrop" of the story, trading on the area's associations with drug use and prostitution. Tracey Thorn covered the song in 2007. Songwriter David Gedge also wrote a song called "King's Cross" while recording under the name Cinerama.

== Rail ==
=== King's Cross station ===
King's Cross station is a railway terminus and London Underground interchange, and a focal point in the district.

Commuter services from King's Cross are operated by Thameslink and Great Northern, serving destinations in north London, such as Finsbury Park, Harringay, and Enfield Town. Destinations further afield include Welwyn Garden City, Stevenage, Peterborough, Cambridge, and King's Lynn. Long-distance departures from King's Cross are operated by Grand Central, Lumo, Hull Trains, and LNER. Trains serve destinations in the East Midlands, Yorkshire, North East England and Scotland, including Leeds, Newcastle upon Tyne, and Edinburgh.

In fiction, the station is the London terminus of the Hogwarts Express, which carries Harry Potter to Hogwarts. In the Harry Potter films, however, the exterior shots of the station are those of neighbouring St Pancras station. Some interior shots were filmed at York railway station.

The Goods Yard complex, part of the King's Cross Central development, was a rail freight terminal. The Yard was designed by Lewis Cubitt in 1852. The nearby Granary Square is named after the Granary building. Trains carried Lincolnshire wheat to King's Cross, where the wheat would then be stored in the Granary building to be used by London's bakers.

=== St Pancras International ===
St Pancras International station is in the district.

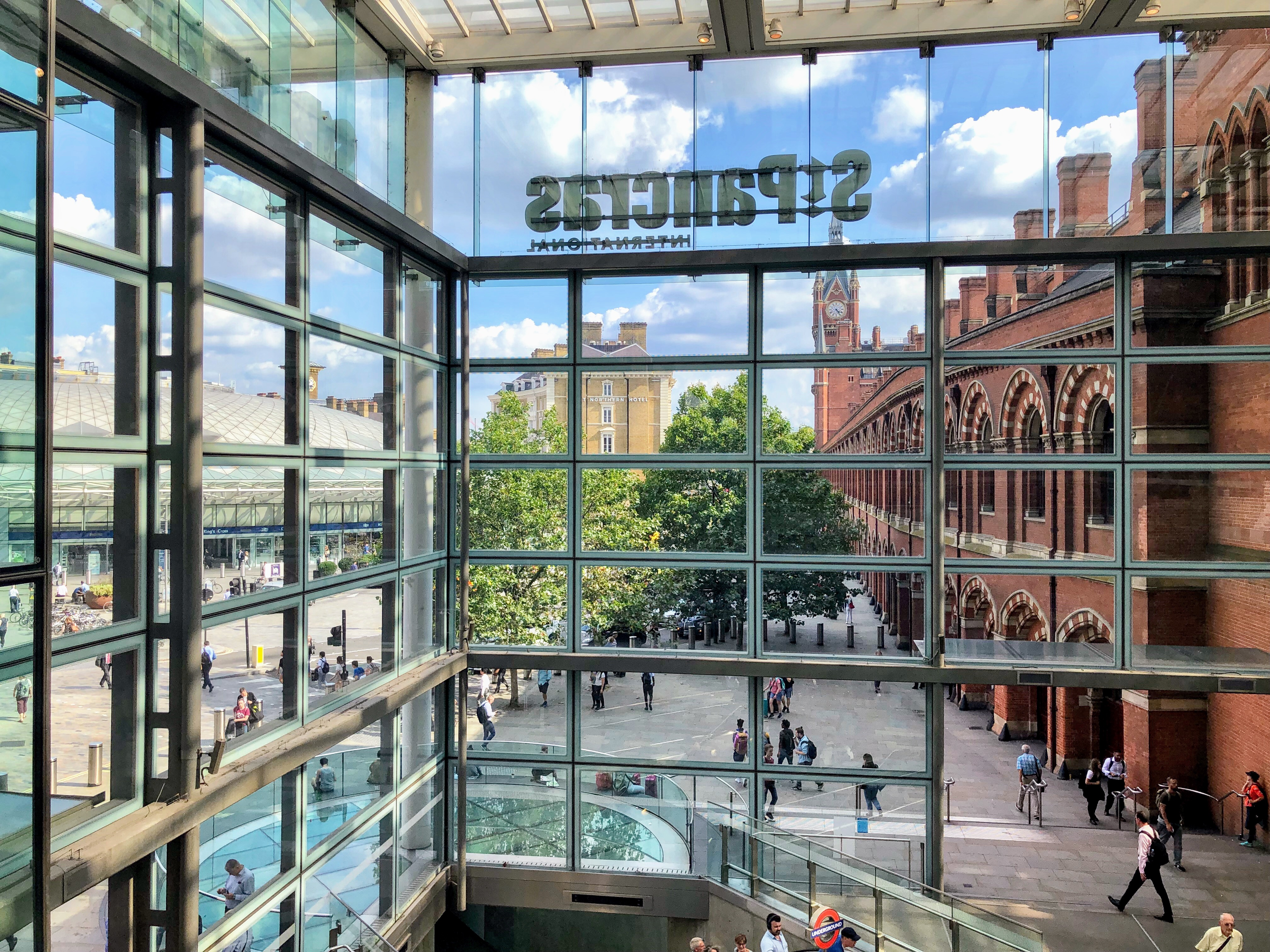
St Pancras station

St Pancras is Eurostar's London terminus. International destinations include Amsterdam, Brussels, and Paris.

The station is also the terminus of Southeastern High Speed services from Kent and Stratford International (where London's Queen Elizabeth Olympic Park is situated).

Other long-distance National Rail services are operated by East Midlands Railway to cities such as Leicester and Sheffield.

Thameslink operates regional services across London, South East England, and East Anglia. Trains serve key UK destinations including Bedford, Brighton, Cambridge, and Luton. They also serve several major London destinations, including Farringdon, Finsbury Park, and London Bridge. These routes provide the King's Cross area with direct links to Gatwick and Luton Airports.

=== Euston station ===
Euston station sits around one-half mile (800 m) west of King's Cross. National Rail trains from Euston serve the West Midlands, North Wales, North West England, and Scotland. Destinations include Birmingham, Liverpool, Manchester, Holyhead, and Glasgow.

London Overground services run between Euston and Watford Junction, via Willesden Junction, Wembley Central, and Harrow & Wealdstone.

A business partnership group has designed a "Wellbeing Walk" between Euston and St Pancras stations. The route avoids Euston Road, and the group claims that their route, compared to the Euston Road route, reduces pedestrians' exposure to air pollution by 50%.

=== London Underground ===
King's Cross St Pancras tube station is on several London Underground lines:

- Circle, Hammersmith & City, and Metropolitan lines
- Northern line (Bank branch)
- Piccadilly line
- Victoria line

The Piccadilly line links King's Cross directly to Heathrow Airport and the West End, whilst the Circle, Hammersmith & City, Metropolitan, and Northern lines link the area to the City.

Euston tube station is nearby, which is served by both branches of the Northern line, and the Victoria line.

Both stations are in London fare zone 1.

== Transport ==
=== Bus and coach ===
With three railway stations and two tube stations locally, much of the area is used as a transport interchange.

London Buses 17, 30, 46, 63, 73, 91, 205, 214, 390 and 476 serve the district during the daytime.

National Express coach A8 connects the district to Stansted Airport, whilst Green Line coach 748 links the area to Hemel Hempstead in Hertfordshire.

=== Cycling ===
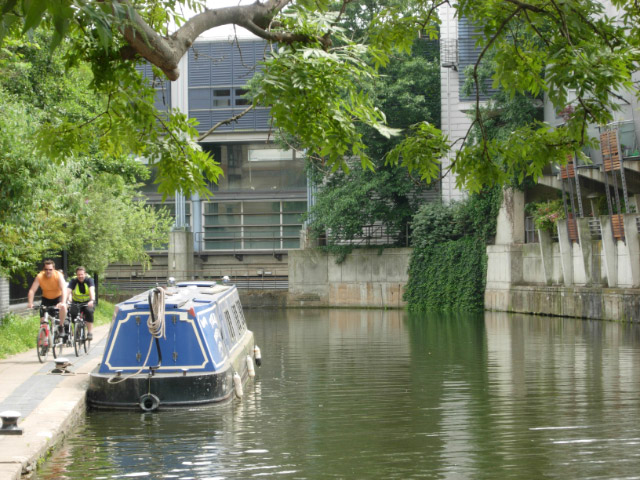
The Regent's Canal between King's Cross and Camden Town

Several cycle routes pass through King's Cross. Cycling infrastructure is maintained by the London Borough of Camden and Transport for London (TfL).

Cycleway 6 runs north–south along Midland Road (between St Pancras station and the British Library) and Judd Street. Northbound, Cycleway 6 passes east of Camden Town en route to Kentish Town. Southbound, the route links King's Cross to Farringdon, the City, and Elephant & Castle.

The Regent's Canal Towpath runs westbound from King's Cross to Camden Lock, Regent's Park, and Maida Vale. The Islington Tunnel means that eastbound cyclists must bypass the canal through Angel, but the path continues to the west of Angel towards Hoxton, Victoria Park, Mile End, and Limehouse.

Cycling infrastructure is also provided along Mabledon Place (towards Bloomsbury), York Way (towards Barnsbury and Kentish Town), Pentonville Road (towards Farringdon), Goods Way (between St Pancras International and York Way), and Argyle Street (between Gray's Inn Road and Euston Road).

There are cycle parking facilities throughout the district. Several bicycle-sharing systems operate in the area, including the Santander Cycles scheme.

=== Road ===
The district is centred around a busy junction at which several major routes meet:

- A201 King's Cross Road | Southbound: Farringdon, the City, Elephant & Castle
- A501 Euston Road/Pentonville Road | Westbound: Ring Road (W), Euston, Marylebone | Eastbound: Ring Road (E), Angel, the A1
- A5200 York Way/Gray's Inn Road | Northbound: Barnsbury, Archway | Southbound: Bloomsbury, Holborn
- A5202 Pancras Road | Northbound: Camden Town, Kentish Town
- A5203 Caledonian Road | Northbound: Islington, Holloway
- B512 Crowndale Road | Westbound: Camden Town

Euston Road and Pentonville Road both appear on the London edition of the game, Monopoly.

=== Camden Highline ===
From 2015 to 2026, there was a proposal for a walking connection to and from Camden Town. The Camden Highline was a proposed public park and garden walk alongside the North London line. The project was abandoned in May 2026.

== Nearby attractions ==
- Platform 9 3/4
- Camden Town Hall
- The British Library
- Camley Street Natural Park
- London Canal Museum
- House of Illustration
- St Pancras Old Church
- Kings Place
- Charles Dickens Museum
- The Foundling Museum
- Guildhall Art Gallery
- Gagosian Gallery
- British Postal Museum and Archive
- Gasholder No. 8
- Royal Mail Mount Pleasant Sorting Office
- Coal Drops Yard shopping complex
