= Keeper of Zoology, Natural History Museum =

The Keeper of Zoology was a zoological academic position within the Natural History Museum (previously British Museum [Natural History])in London, England. The Keeper of Zoology acted as the head of the Department of Zoology. The following is a list of those who have held this position, which existed until 2013 when the Department of Zoology was merged with the departments of Entomology and Botany to form the Department of Life Sciences. Dates are those in office.

- John George Children 1837–1840
- John Edward Gray 1840–1875
- Albert Karl Ludwig Gotthilf Günther 1875–1895
- William Henry Flower 1895–1898
- Edwin Ray Lankester 1898–1907
- Sidney Frederic Harmer 1909–1921
- Charles Tate Regan 1921–1927
- William Thomas Calman 1927–1936
- Martin Alister Campbell Hinton 1936–1945
- Norman Boyd Kinnear 1945–1947
- Hampton Wildman Parker 1947–1957
- Francis Charles Fraser 1957–1964
- John Philip Harding 1964–1971
- John Gordon Sheals 1971–1985
- John Fordyce Peake 1985–1989
- Colin Robert Curds 1993–1997 (acting 1989–1993)
- Philip Stephen Rainbow 1997–2013

== See also ==
- Keeper of Botany
