= Battlebridge Basin =

Canal basin in King's Cross, London, United Kingdom

Coordinates: 51.534622°N 0.120817°W

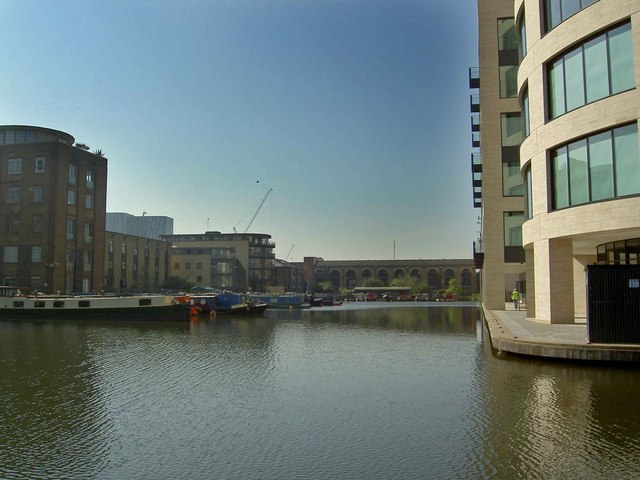
- Battlebridge Basin from the main canal

Specifications
- Status: Open
- Navigation authority: Canal & River Trust

History
- Date completed: 1822

Battlebridge Basin is a canal basin in King's Cross, in the London Borough of Islington. It is located off the Regent's Canal.

== Current use ==
The basin contains a number of residential moorings. It is the site of the London Canal Museum, opened in 1992, the London offices of academic publisher Springer Nature Group, and Kings Place development completed in 2008 and home to The Guardian. It is around 140 metres (460 ft) long and 50 metres (160 ft) wide. Sixteen Moorings along the southside are part of the London Narrowboat Company, and further moorings to the East side Ice Wharf, Run by the Canal & River Trust.

== History ==
The basin was constructed in 1820 at the same time as the second half of the canal from Camden Town to Limehouse, though the wharf buildings were not completed until 1822. It was originally known as Horsfall Basin after the original landowner, and later as Maiden Lane Basin. Its current name comes from the former name for the King's Cross area, named after an ancient bridge over the River Fleet.

The canal museum buildings were used in the second half of the 19th century and early 20th century for the storage of ice from Norway and its distribution to the surrounding area.

== See also ==
- List of canal basins in the United Kingdom
