= Gustaf Otto Rosenberg =

Swedish botanist

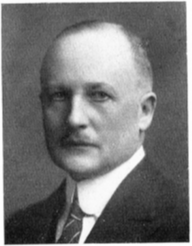
Gustaf Otto Rosenberg

Gustaf Otto Rosenberg, termed Otto Rosenberg in publications (born 9 June 1872 in Gothenburg, Sweden; died 30 November 1948) was a Swedish botanist; son of Johan Olof Rosenberg.

Rosenberg studied in Uppsala, Stockholm and Bonn, he gained a bachelor's degree at the University of Uppsala in 1895, and a PhD in Bonn in 1899 where he studied under Eduard Strasburger (1844–1912). His PhD thesis addressed the cytological changes that occur in the cells of the Sundew plant (Drosera) when they are irritated. Also in 1899, he became an associate professor of botany at the University of Stockholm. Rosenberg worked at the Botanical Institute in Stockholm from 1904 and was promoted to a professorship in plant anatomy and cytology in 1911, at the same university.

Later, Rosenberg studied meiosis in the hybrid of Drosera longifolia crossed with D. rotundifolia, this was the first cytologically examined plant hybrid. The former of the two parent species contained 40 chromosomes, the latter 20; however, the near-sterile hybrid (D. obovata) contained 30 chromosomes. This Drosera 'scheme’ was almost certainly the first example of the parents of a hybrid being identified through the analysis of chromosome pairing during meiosis.

Rosenberg's writings dealt mainly in cytology and plant embryology and he became very prominent in these fields. In 1917 he was elected a member of the Royal Swedish Academy of Sciences and, in 1925, a member of the Royal Danish Academy of Sciences and Letters. Rosenberg became a Commander of the Order of the Polar Star on 22 November 1932.

The standard author abbreviation O.Rosenb. is used to indicate this person as the author when citing a botanical name.
