= Sidnie Manton =

British entomologist (1902–1979)

- Born: 4 May 1902; Kensington, London, England
- Died: 2 January 1979 (aged 76)
- Education: St Paul's Girls' School
- Alma mater: Girton College, Cambridge (Sc.D., 1934)
- Known for: Contributions to zoology, marine biology
- Spouse: John Philip Harding (m. 1937)
- Awards: Montifiore Prize (1925); Linnean Medal (1963); Frink Medal (1977)
- Scientific career
- Fields: Entomology, zoology
- Institutions: Girton College, Cambridge

Sidnie Milana Manton FLS FRS (4 May 1902 – 2 January 1979) was an influential British zoologist. She is known for making advances in the field of functional morphology. She is regarded as being one of the most outstanding zoologists of the twentieth century.

== Early life ==
Sidnie Milana Manton was born in Kensington, London the daughter of a descendant of French aristocracy and a dentist. She was educated at the Froebel Demonstration School and at St. Paul's Girls' School before joining Girton College, Cambridge in 1921. While at Girton College she was awarded the Montifiore Prize in 1925. She came top of the class list, but was not awarded the prize that that position usually brings, because women were not at that time officially members of Cambridge University.

== Career ==
Manton initially worked as an Alfred Yarrow Research Student at Girton College, Cambridge, and later was the first woman to receive a Doctor of Science (ScD) title from Cambridge University and the first woman to hold the post of Demonstrator in Comparative Anatomy at Cambridge University. She took part in an expedition to the Great Barrier Reef in 1928-1929, which was the first scientific study of any coral reef in the world. Manton was responsible for collection and preservation of specimens, particularly arthropods. The scientists, including Manton, collected unprecedented data on the reef's ecology and health, data which are still in use today. As her career at Cambridge University developed, she became Director of Studies in Natural Sciences, Director of Studies in Geography and Lecturer. While at Cambridge University she worked on the evolution of the arthropods, publishing "The Arthropoda: Habits, Functional Morphology and Evolution" in 1977.

Manton died on 2 January 1979. Her archives are held at the Natural History Museum, and a collection of her letters and Diaries were published in 2020.

== Honours and awards ==
She was elected a Fellow of the Royal Society in March 1948, one of the first women to receive this honour. She was also a Fellow of the Linnean Society, and was awarded a Gold Medal by the Linnean Society in 1963. In 1968, she was awarded an honorary doctorate from the University of Lund in 1968. The Zoological Society of London awarded her the Frink Medal in 1977 for "the advances made by her towards the understanding of arthropod evolution.".

Together these awards demonstrate the very high esteem in which her work was held during her lifetime, but recognition has also continued after her death. In 1992, the Manton crater on Venus was named after Sidnie Manton and her sister Irene Manton. In 2018 the British Ecological Society and the Journal of Animal Ecology inaugurated the Sidnie Manton Award for early career ecologists.

== Personal life ==
Manton's sister was the botanist Professor Irene Manton FRS. Manton married John Philip Harding in 1937. They had one son and one daughter.
