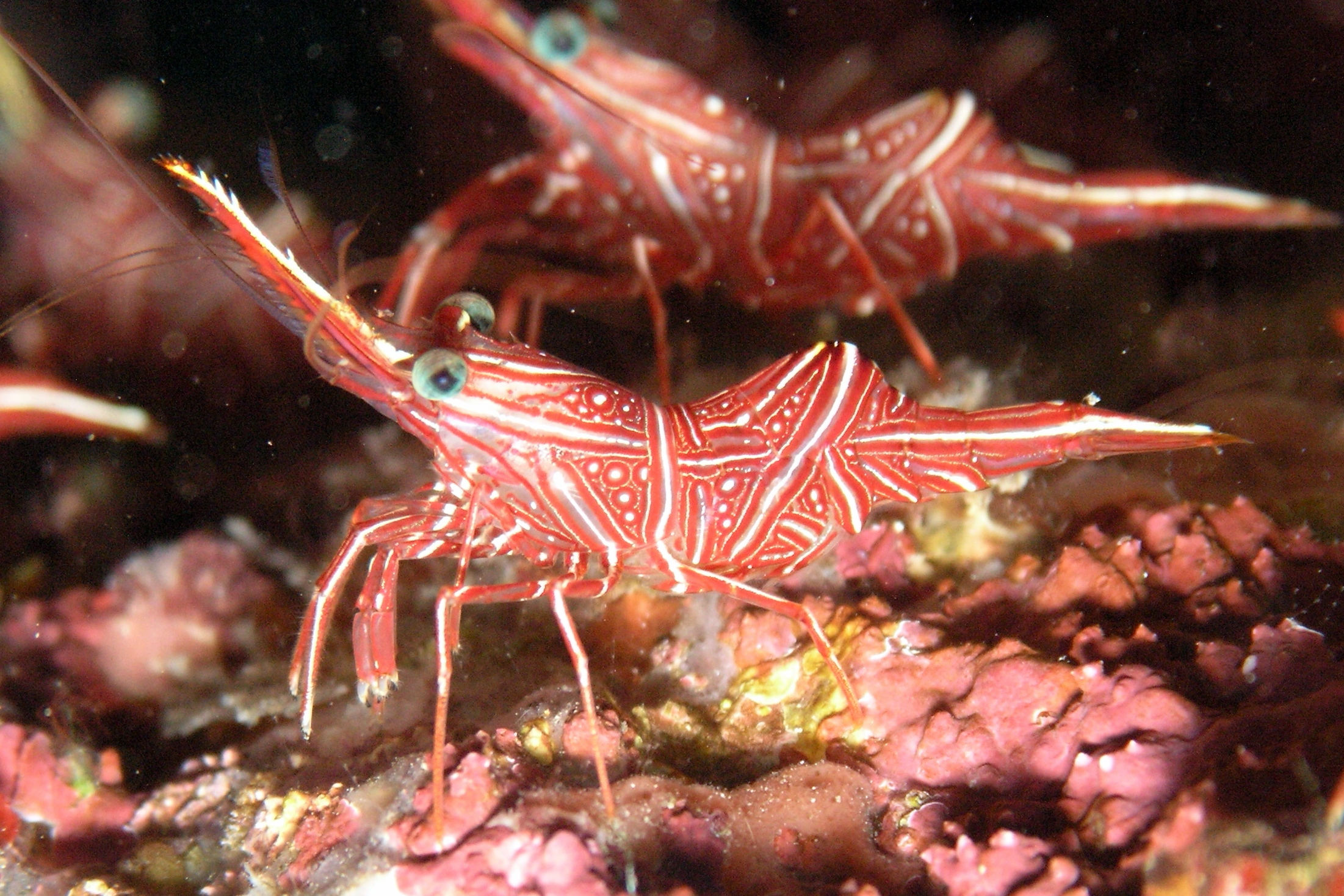
- Rhynchocinetes durbanensis

Scientific classification
- Domain: Eukaryota
- Kingdom: Animalia
- Phylum: Arthropoda
- Class: Malacostraca
- Order: Decapoda
- Suborder: Pleocyemata
- Infraorder: Caridea
- Family: Rhynchocinetidae
- Genus: Rhynchocinetes; H. Milne-Edwards, 1837

Type species
- Rhynchocinetes typus H. Milne-Edwards, 1837

= Rhynchocinetes =

Genus of crustaceans

Rhynchocinetes is a genus of shrimp, containing the following 14 species:

- Rhynchocinetes albatrossae Chace, 1997
- Rhynchocinetes australis Hale, 1941
- Rhynchocinetes balssi Gordon, 1936
- Rhynchocinetes brucei Okuno, 1994
- Rhynchocinetes conspiciocellus Okuno & Takeda, 1992
- Rhynchocinetes durbanensis Gordon, 1936
- Rhynchocinetes enigma Okuno, 1997
- Rhynchocinetes holthuisi Okuno, 1997
- Rhynchocinetes ikatere Yaldwyn, 1971
- Rhynchocinetes kuiteri Tiefenbacher, 1983
- Rhynchocinetes rathbunae Okuno, 1996
- Rhynchocinetes serratus (H. Milne-Edwards, 1837)
- Rhynchocinetes typus H. Milne-Edwards, 1837 – type species
- Rhynchocinetes uritai Kubo, 1942
