= London Canal Museum =

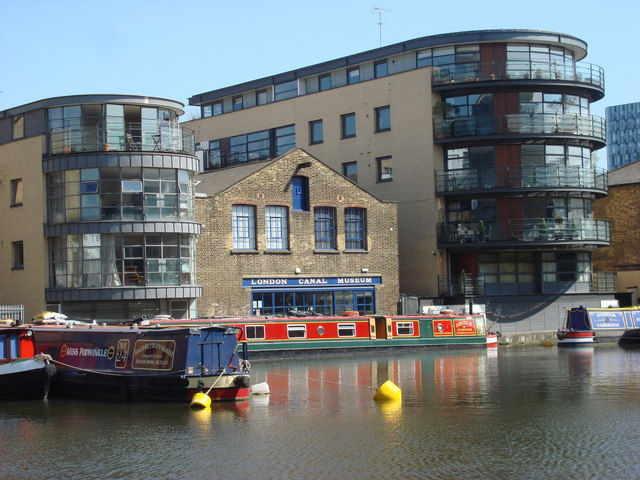

- Location within Central London
- Established: 1992; 34 years ago
- Location: King's Cross, London, N1; England
- Coordinates: 51°32′02″N 0°07′13″W
- Type: Transport museum
- Visitors: 20,000
- Chairperson: Martin Sach
- Public transit access: King's Cross St Pancras; King's Cross; St Pancras
- Website: canalmuseum.org.uk

London Canal Museum in the King's Cross area of London, England, is a regional museum devoted to the history of London's canals. The museum opened in 1992.

== Exhibitions and activities ==
The museum covers all aspects of the UK's waterways. The main exhibitions in the museum cover the following topics:

- History of the London canals, the Regents Canal in particular
- Water and Locks – canal engineering
- Boats and Cargoes
- Methods of traction by horses, internal combustion engines, and miniature tractors
- Carlo Gatti and the ice trade
- Social history of canal workers
- Lifting and handling
- The decorative arts of the canals known as "roses and castles"

The museum also hosts temporary exhibitions on canal related subjects.

The museum runs guided trips on its 12-seater trip boat Long Tom. These trips include 50 minute return trips through the Islington Tunnel and longer return trips to Little Venice and Victoria Park.

== History of the building ==
The museum is housed in a Victorian former ice warehouse that was used by Carlo Gatti. The building was constructed between 1862 and 1863 to house ice imported from Norway by ship and canal barge. The building was extensively rebuilt 1904 to 1906 when the existing ground and 1st floors and ramp were constructed and stables installed. The use of the ice wells to store ice finished prior to the First World War and Gatti's ceased to use the building as a transport depot around 1926. It was then used by various engineering firms before its conversion to a food importer's warehouse in 1956, when the stable fittings were stripped out and the lightwell was infilled with a staircase and toilets. The ice wells were filled with garden soil and miscellaneous debris around that time, according to the archaeological evidence of the fill materials, and were sealed up and forgotten until their accidental rediscovery in the 1980s.

Of the two partly excavated ice wells under the building, one may be viewed from the public area of the museum and the other using CCTV that can be viewed on the Museum web site.

== Location ==
The museum is situated in the King's Cross area of London, on the Regent's Canal. Battlebridge Basin is accessible from the rear of the museum. It is a five-minute walk to King's Cross St Pancras tube station.

== See also ==
- Canal & River Trust
- The Canal Museum
