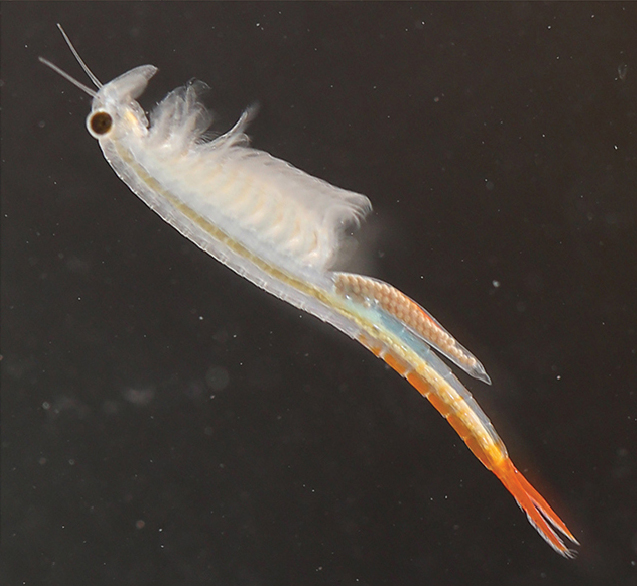
- Streptocephalus, an anostracan

Scientific classification
- Kingdom: Animalia
- Phylum: Arthropoda
- Subphylum: Crustacea
- Subclass: Entomostraca Müller, 1785

= Entomostraca =

Entomostraca Temporal range: Cambrian–Recent

Obsolete class of arthropods

Entomostraca is a historical subclass of crustaceans, no longer in technical use. It was originally considered one of the two major lineages of crustaceans (the other being the class Malacostraca), combining all other classes—Branchiopoda, Cephalocarida, Ostracoda, Copepoda and the obsolete Maxillopoda. The Ostracoda have the body enclosed in a bivalve shell-covering, and are normally unsegmented. The Branchiopoda have a very variable number of body-segments, with or without a shield, simple or bivalved, and some of the post-oral appendages normally branchial. The Copepoda normally have a segmented body, not enclosed in a bi-valved shell-covering, fewer than twelve segments, the limbs not branchial.
