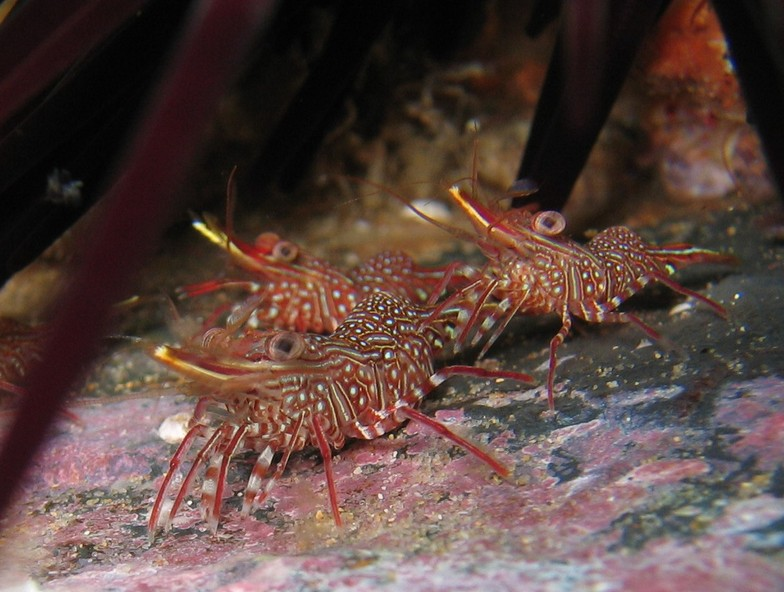
- Rhynchocinetes spp. sheltering under a sea urchin

Scientific classification
- Kingdom: Animalia
- Phylum: Arthropoda
- Clade: Pancrustacea
- Class: Malacostraca
- Order: Decapoda
- Suborder: Pleocyemata
- Infraorder: Caridea
- Superfamily: Nematocarcinoidea
- Family: Rhynchocinetidae; Ortmann, 1890

Genera
- Cinetorhynchus; Rhynchocinetes

= Rhynchocinetidae =

Family of crustaceans

The family Rhynchocinetidae are a group of small, reclusive red-and-white shrimp. This family typically has an upward-hinged foldable rostrum, hence its taxon name Rhynchocinetidae, which means movable beak; this gives these shrimps their common name of hinge-beak shrimps. The family contains only two genera, Cinetorhynchus and Rhynchocinetes.

== Taxonomy ==
Rhynchocinetidae has historically been considered to include the single genus Rhynchocinetes, which was subdivided into two sub-genera. However, in 1995, Holthuis elevated the subgenus Cinetorhynchus to full generic status based on morphology. Members of Rhynchocinetes have two acute teeth on the central carina of the carapace, a supraorbital spine and no spine on the margins of the fourth and fifth abdominal somites. Cinetorhynchus differs in having three teeth on the carapace, no supraorbital spine and a single spine each on the margins of the fourth and fifth abdominal somites.

== Description ==
Members of the family Rhynchocinetidae are colourful crustaceans, mostly banded or patterned in red and white. The rostrum is partially or completely articulated with the carapace and can be moved in a variety of ways. The advantages of this adaptation are unclear, but in combination with the spiny rostrum, it may enable the shrimp to wedge itself into a crevice and avoid being dislodged by a predator. The first pair of chelipeds are more robust than the second pair, and the carpus of the second pair is undivided. In males, particularly in larger, older individuals, the third pair of maxillipeds and the first pair of chelipeds are exceptionally large in proportion to those of females and younger males. Both pairs of chelipeds bear a bundle of spines at the tip which when retracted form a basket-like cage.

== Distribution and habitat ==
Members of the family Rhynchocinetidae are found in both tropical and some temperate waters, from the littoral zone down to the continental shelf, inhabiting both coral and rocky reefs.

== Ecology ==
The biology of the family has been little studied. Cinetorhynchus rigens in Bermuda was not attracted to baited traps but on examination, its faecal pellets contained mollusc shell fragments, algae and sponge spicules. It was nocturnal, hiding by day in crevices and emerging at night to feed.
