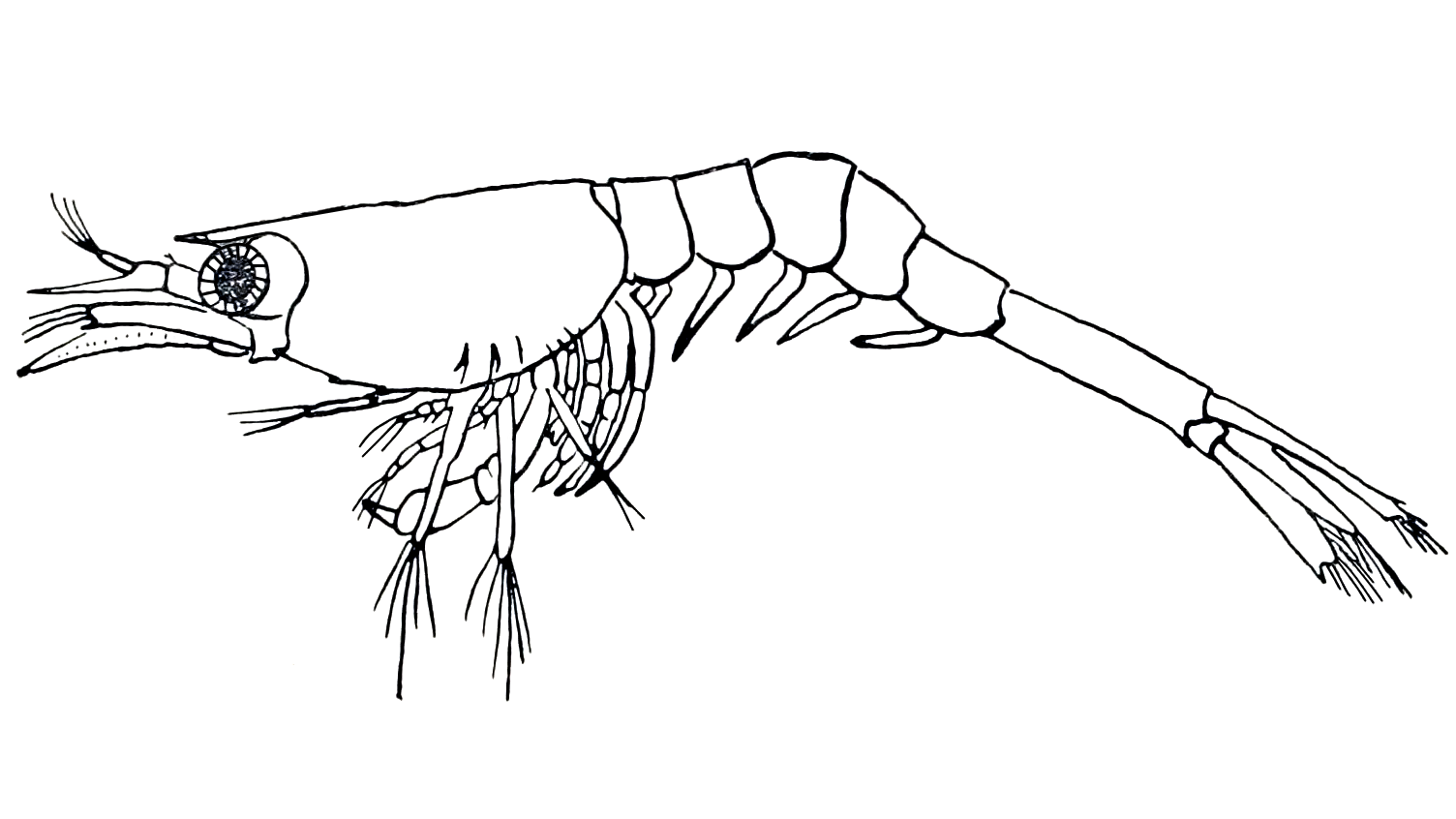

Scientific classification
- Kingdom: Animalia
- Phylum: Arthropoda
- Class: Malacostraca
- Order: Decapoda
- Suborder: Pleocyemata
- Infraorder: Caridea
- Family: Crangonidae
- Genus: Crangon
- Species: C. allmani

Binomial name
- Crangon allmani Kinahan, 1860

= Crangon allmani =

Species of crustacean

Crangon allmani, also spelled Crangon allmanni, is a species of shrimp in the genus Crangon. It is at home in the northeast Atlantic Ocean. Its specific name, allmani, honours the Irish natural historian George J. Allman. According to J. A. Allen, the spelling allmanni is a writing error and the correct spelling is allmani.

== Description ==
Crangon allmani body length is up to 77 mm. It has a brownish-gray to reddish-gray colour. The short rostrum is about half as long as the eyes and is small with a rounded end. The carapace is smooth except for some small items. Crangon allmani can be distinguished from the North Sea shrimp Crangon crangon by a longitudinal furrow along the back on the sixth and hindmost pleon segment. A ridge occurs along each side of the furrow. Two pairs of small thorns are on the telson.

Male and female specimens can be distinguished by examining the swimmerets. On the endopodite of the second swimmeret of the male is a clamp-like feature called the appendix masculina.

== Distribution and habitat ==
Crangon allmani is restricted to the east boreal zone of the Atlantic Ocean. The species is found from the White Sea to the Bay of Biscay, as well as in the North Sea, the Kattegat, and around Iceland. It can be found around Shetland and the Faroe Islands, as well.

It is found at a depth between 20 and 250 m, and occasionally as deep as 360 m. It inhabits sandy or muddy sea bottoms.

== Way of life ==
Crangon allmani primarily eats crustaceans and ringworms (Annelida). Occasionally, it eats mollusks, Foraminifera, and brittle stars (Ophiuroidea). Scales of Merlangius (whiting) have been found in the stomachs of some individuals.

Its behaviour is to some extent determined by sex. The first egg-laying females appear in small numbers at the end of the first weeks of December. Their number reaches its maximum of 26% in April and May; a further maximum is apparent in the offshore populations in July. Newly laid eggs are translucent gold-coloured, round, and 0.39 mm in diameter. During their development, the eggs become longer and reach a length around 0.69 mm before hatching. The females carry on average up to 2500 eggs; larger individuals can carry up to 7000 eggs. The development time for the larvae is about seven weeks. Most shrimp reach an age of three years; some grow one year older. Possibly, the males die earlier, shortly after copulation.

== Fishing and exploitation ==
Crangon allmani is not commercially fished and has no commercial value.
