= Metacrangon munita =

Scientific classification
- Domain: Eukaryota
- Kingdom: Animalia
- Phylum: Arthropoda
- Class: Malacostraca
- Order: Decapoda
- Suborder: Pleocyemata
- Infraorder: Caridea
- Family: Crangonidae
- Genus: Metacrangon
- Species: M. munita

Binomial name
- Metacrangon munita (Dana, 1852)

Synonyms
- Crangon munitus Dana, 1852

Species of crustacean

Metacrangon munita, commonly known as the coastal spinyhead, is a species of caridean shrimp native to the northeastern Pacific Ocean.

== Description ==
Male Metacrangon munita grow to a length of about 3.3 cm (1.3 in) and females to about 4.8 cm (1.9 in). The rostrum is short and rounded, and the carapace bears two median spines, one submedian spine on each side and a forward-pointing, hepatic spine just below and in front of the submedian spine. The anterior median spine is much shorter than the posterior one and does not extend as far as the eye sockets. There are five pairs of legs and the dactyl of the fifth leg is not wide and flattened. The pale brown and whitish disruptive coloration as well as the spines and bristles on the carapace make it difficult to discern the features of this shrimp.

== Distribution and habitat ==
This shrimp occurs in the northeastern Pacific Ocean, its range extending from Alaska southwards to southern California, its depth range being between 12 and 230 m (40 and 750 ft). It is found on sandy substrates.

== Ecology ==
This shrimp is nocturnal. A parasitic isopod sometimes attaches to its gills.
