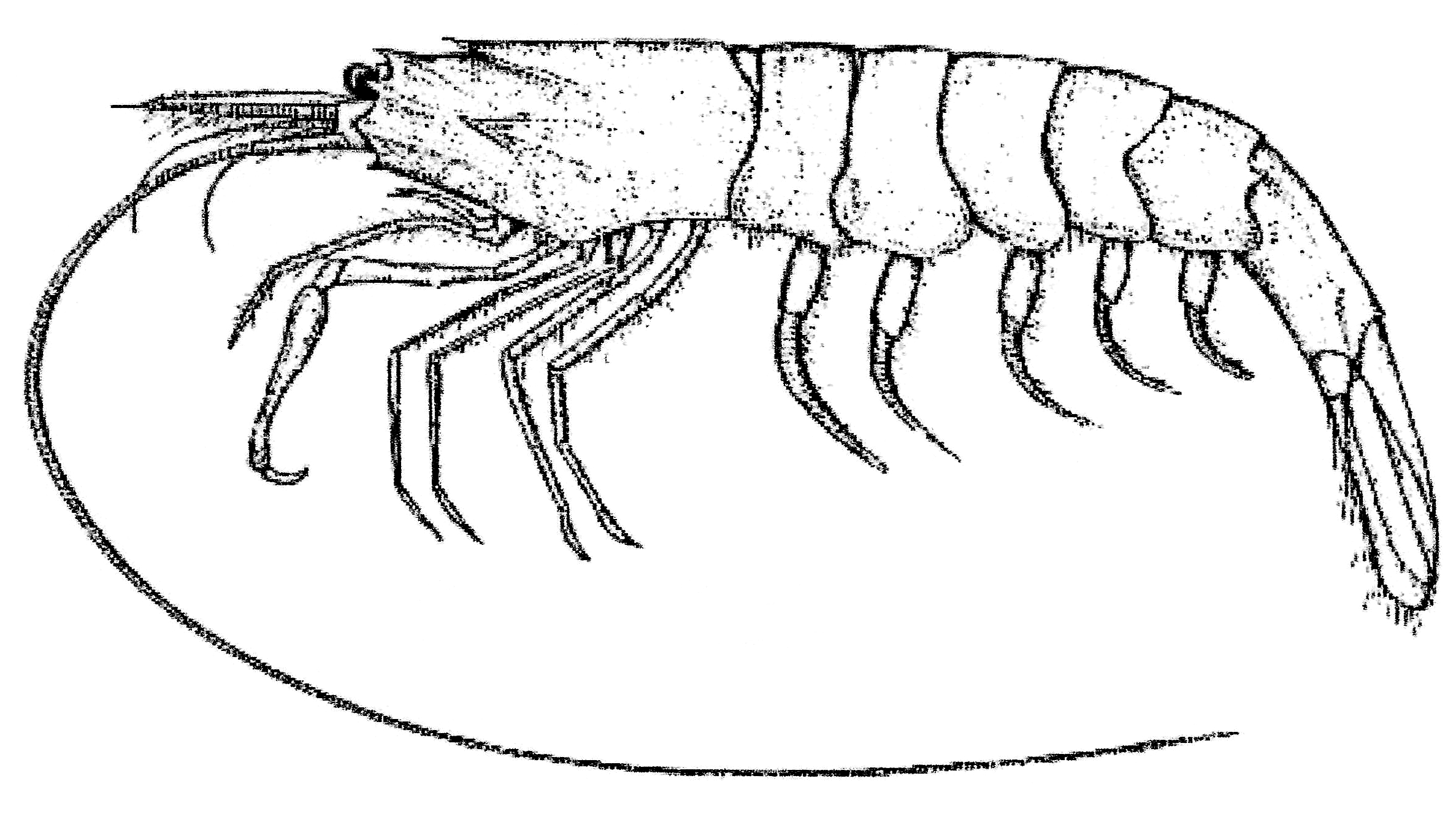

Scientific classification
- Kingdom: Animalia
- Phylum: Arthropoda
- Class: Malacostraca
- Order: Decapoda
- Suborder: Pleocyemata
- Infraorder: Caridea
- Family: Crangonidae
- Genus: Crangon
- Species: C. franciscorum

Binomial name
- Crangon franciscorum Stimpson, 1856

= Crangon franciscorum =

Species of crustacean

Crangon franciscorum is a species of shrimp in the family Crangonidae which is endemic to the brackish estuaries of California, and found from Puget Sound in the north to San Diego, California in the south. The species is especially abundant in San Francisco Bay, despite population fluctuations due to environmental stresses. Its common names include bay shrimp, sand shrimp, common shrimp, grass shrimp, black shrimp, California shrimp and black tailed shrimp. The species has been commercially fished from 1869 to the present.

== Role in the Bay food web ==
This shrimp species is "an important part of the estuarine food web" in the greater San Francisco Bay. It feeds on bivalves, amphipods and foraminiferins, and is prey for various fish, including striped bass, white sturgeon, Pacific tomcod and shellfish such as Dungeness crab. Its diet is "heavily influenced by predator size, temperature-salinity preferences, and prey availability."

== Lifecycle ==
The shrimp are short-lived, with a lifespan ranging up to 18 months for males and 30 months for females. The males spawn once, while longer-lived females spawn twice. Some evidence indicates the species may be protandrous hermaphrodites, which means that surviving males are transformed into females after one year of life. This may account for the longer lifespan of females.

The two most important natural environmental factors affecting the health of the shrimp population are water temperature and salinity. The shrimp thrive in brackish water, with a preferred salinity of 14 parts per thousand (ppt) when young to 24 ppt when ready to spawn. In contrast, open ocean waters have a salinity of about 35 ppt. The species prefers a water temperature of about 18 °C, or 65 °F. Because these factors vary within the bay, based on the seasons each year, and the variations in the inflow of fresh water in heavy rainfall years as opposed to drought years, the shrimp migrate around the bay, seeking optimal conditions, and their population levels fluctuate dramatically. When heavy flows of fresh water enter the bay, mature females migrate to the saltier parts of the central bay, or out the Golden Gate to the Gulf of the Farallones. There, they mate with males which prefer a slightly saltier environment. The females then incubate from 2,000 to 8,000 eggs and when hatched, the young shrimp migrate back to the shallower and less salty estuaries around the bay. As the newly hatched shrimp develop and mature, they gradually migrate to "deeper, cooler and more saline water".

== Environmental stresses ==
When exposed to sewage in a laboratory, the species shows behavior described as "avoidance of the toxicant". It is "sensitive to pollution in estuaries".

In the late 19th and early 20th centuries, San Francisco Bay became increasingly polluted. The Gold Rush, which proceeded commercial shrimp fishing, caused the first significant environmental damage to San Francisco Bay. Hydraulic mining techniques introduced tens of millions of cubic meters annually of rock and soil debris into the Sacramento and San Joaquin Rivers, the main sources of fresh water put into the bay. The accumulation of sediment on the bottom of the bay reduced total water volume and changed tidal patterns. Hydraulic mining was banned by an 1884 court decision. The size of the bay shrank as dikes were built to create farmland and salt ponds, and areas of the bay were filled to create real estate, such as San Francisco's Marina District, Treasure Island, and Foster City. The vast majority of the tidal marshes around the bay, where the shrimp thrive, were lost to development by the 1980s.

The Central Valley Project, which began in 1933, and the California State Water Project, which began in 1960, were efforts using dams, reservoirs, and canals, to divert water from the Sacramento and San Joaquin River systems for use in agricultural irrigation and urban development. By the 1980s, the annual inflow of fresh water into the bay was reduced to about 40% of historic levels.

Following prolonged droughts, the shrimp population declines, and following wet years, it rebounds. In 1996, after two wet years, the shrimp population was 20 times larger than it was in 1980, following the severe drought of the late 1970s.

== Commercial fishing ==
This species was by far the most common species of shrimp in San Francisco Bay in the 19th century, and was also the most important species for its commercial shrimp fishery from the 1870s to the 1930s, accounting for about 90% of the shrimp catch.
