= Shrimp croquettes =

Flemish dish

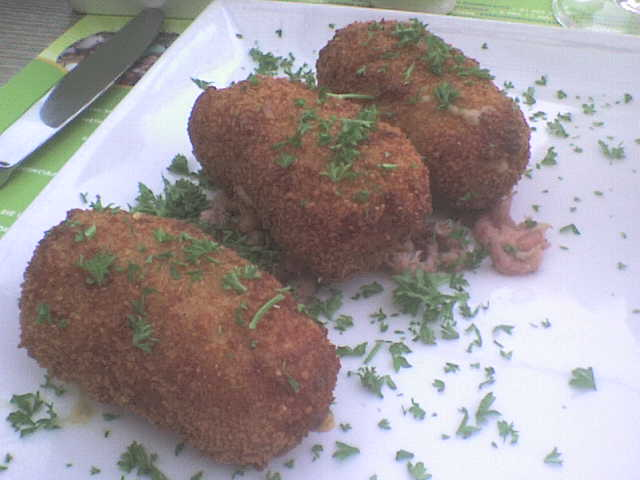
- Shrimp croquettes

Shrimp croquettes, known in Dutch as garnaalkroketten, are a Flemish dish made with grey shrimps (Crangon crangon) caught by local fishermen. The traditional method involves cooking immediately on the board itself and peeling by hand. In this recipe, the croquettes should have at least 30% shrimp. After peeling, a dense bisque is made from the remaining heads and shells. This savory soup is the essence of filling, thickened by a roux of flour and butter.

== History ==
Shrimps are first mentioned in 12th-century Flemish writings. They were a source of protein, especially for poor medieval fishermen and their families. In 1850, new docks were built in Ostend. These docks involved stairs so that the fishing boats could approach. These staircases allowed fishermen to sell their leftovers as a small social measure against poverty. They can be considered the archaic version of today's Fish ladder (Vistrap). With the new railway connections, the fishermen could manage to provide supplies to the inner zones. The tradition of cooking shrimp on the ship started after 1885 to ensure fresh quality. The 19th century witnessed the growth of the fishing industry. Fish auctions were held, creating a link between fishermen and buyers. In Ostend, a circular auction building was established in 1879. The auction buildings became more modern over time. With the arrival of tourists by train, fish tasting turned into a tourist attraction. The first shrimp croquette recipe was probably published by Philippe Cauderlier, a chef from Ghent, in his book called Het spaarzame keukenboek (The Thrifty Kitchen Book) in 1914.

== Shrimp Croquette Festival ==
Ostend holds an annual Shrimp Croquette Festival. During the festival, eleven restaurants compete to be awarded the title Best Ostend Shrimp Croquette. Two awards are given: the People's Choice Award, voted on by festival-goers, and a prize from the professional jury. To become eligible for the prize, the criteria must be met: First and foremost, the shrimps must be fresh, peeled by hand, and caught from the North Sea. The croquette must be crunchy and crisp with a neat amount of texture. A cylindrical croquette is the preferred shape because this shape helps the shrimps inside as a whole. Finally, fresh frying oil is needed to have a pure flavour.
