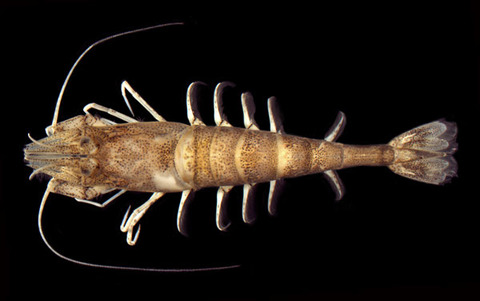

Scientific classification
- Kingdom: Animalia
- Phylum: Arthropoda
- Clade: Pancrustacea
- Class: Malacostraca
- Order: Decapoda
- Suborder: Pleocyemata
- Infraorder: Caridea
- Family: Crangonidae
- Genus: Crangon
- Species: C. septemspinosa

Binomial name
- Crangon septemspinosa Say, 1818

= Crangon septemspinosa =

Species of crustacean

Crangon septemspinosa (sand shrimp), also known as seven-spined bay shrimp, is a species of shrimp commonly found along the Atlantic coast of North America, with a wide range spanning from Newfoundland to eastern Florida. Sand shrimp is often found in eelgrass beds, salt marshes, and estuaries and can be found at depths to 450 m (1,480 ft). At maturity, they can reach about 7 to 7.5 cm in length. Its name derives from the sand-like coloration that helps camouflage the species with its environment.

== Description ==
Sand shrimp is a nocturnal species, which means that it is much more active in dark environments rather than light ones. This increased rate of activity is also more prominent in high temperature environments, as indicated by an increase in respiration rate. At 20°C, the species is observed to adopt a bimodal pattern rather than a uni-modal one.

As a prey resource to many predators, the sand shrimp has a limited prey availability. Fortunately, the species is an unspecialized feeder with an incredibly diverse diet. As such, in the case of a more active lifestyle, the sand shrimp may compensate by altering its diet into a more carnivorous feeding and selectively consume animal tissues, which provide higher energy content.

== Reproduction ==
Sand shrimp appears to have two major reproductive periods. According to an observation of the populations in Mystic River estuary, this is categorized into one in early spring and one in late autumn. Another observation on the species, which was based on the populations of in the Southern Gulf of St. Lawrence estuary, however, categorizes this into spring and late summer instead, followed by smaller portion of reproductive rates in around summer and early fall. It also shows a more continuous reproductive period throughout spring and summer rather than having two separate spawning events in spring and autumn, suggesting a reproduction cycle more distinct than its northerly populations. Hence, the species' mating seasons may vary depending on the species' habitats and locations.

In early spring, mature sand shrimps that are two or three year old immigrate from its regular habitat offshore and into shallow shorelines, where they will then mate and reproduce. This immigration pattern works as a recruitment mechanism within the life history of mature sand shrimps.

Autumn reproduction period averages up to about 1,600 eggs. However, eggs found in spring reproductive period are noted to be most abundant, with about twice as many eggs produced.

== Temperatures on Population Growth ==
Sand shrimps eggs hatch when the water temperatures are optimal in temperature (Modlin, 1976). Temperatures play a crucial factor as it not only determines the length of larval life, but also the species' growth in differing habitats. The populations within the Gulf of Maine suggest that shrimp hatched in warmer season experience faster rates of growth (0.42 - 1.25 mm/week) than those hatched in a colder season (0.31 - 0.83 mm/week). However, in places like Rhode Island, where summer averages about 20°C, growth rates are reported to be as much as four times higher than in Delaware Bay, where summer averages about 27° instead. This implies that optimal temperature may vary depending on the habitat.

== Diets and Feeding Habits ==
In nature, sand shrimp's primary diets consist of mostly organic debris and decaying organic matter. They have an incredibly versatile diet that utilizes a variety of foods. However, they have a preference that includes brine shrimp, clam and eggs. They mainly prefer animal tissue but can survive on other things as well.

=== Hydration ===
Hydration levels in sand shrimp seems to be inversely proportional to the species' satiety level. It is thus safe to assume that water replaces the tissues lost to metabolic processes.
