= Aegaeon =

Aegaeon (Ancient Greek: Αἰγαίων, romanized: Aigaíōn, lit. 'goatish", "stormy", "Aegean') may refer to:

- Aegaeon (moon), Saturn
- Aegaeon (mythology), in Greek mythology
  - A son of Lycaon
  - One of the Gigantes
  - One of the Hecatonchires
- Aegaeon (crustacean), a genus of shrimp
