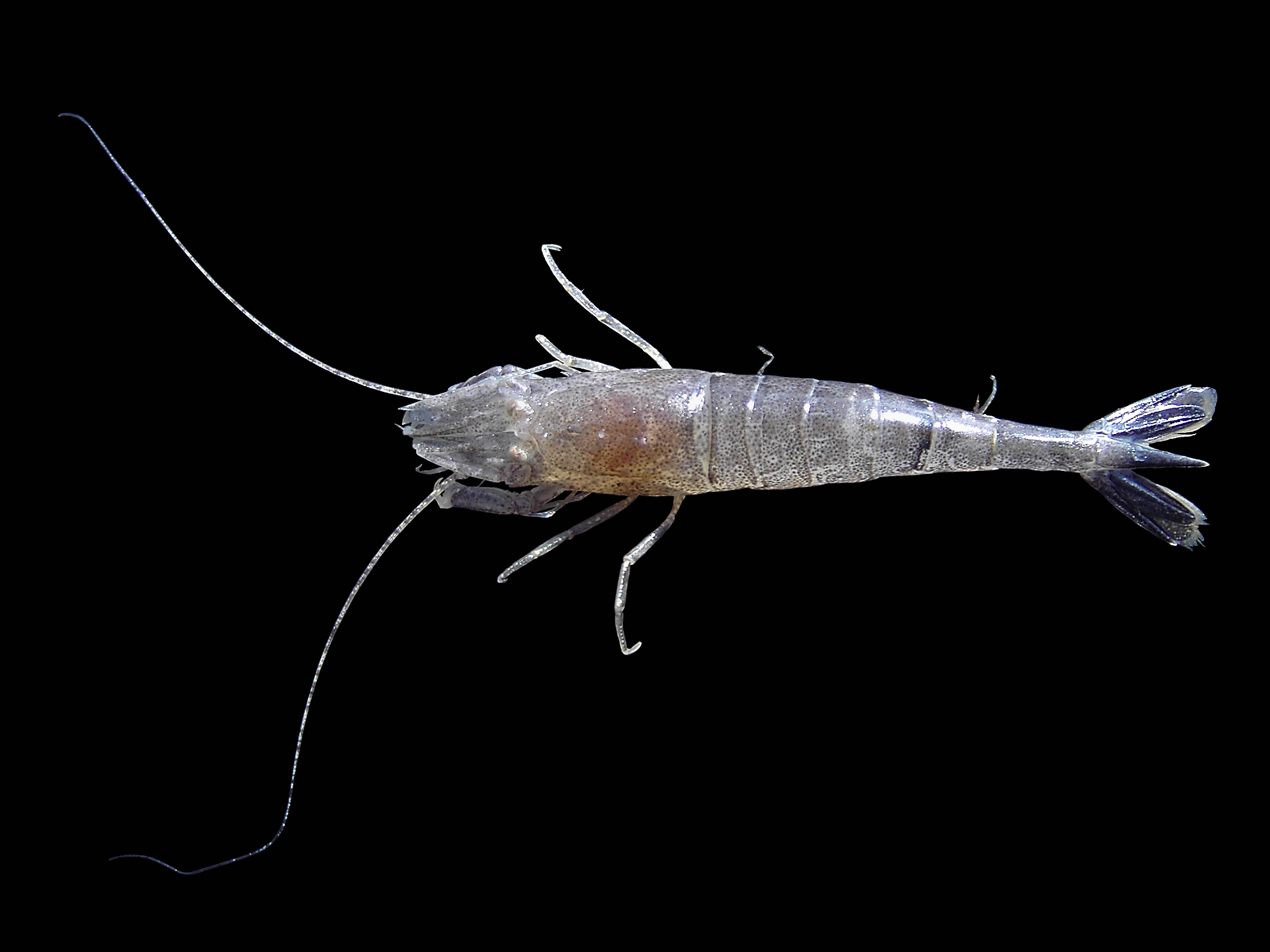
- Crangon crangon

Scientific classification
- Kingdom: Animalia
- Phylum: Arthropoda
- Clade: Pancrustacea
- Class: Malacostraca
- Order: Decapoda
- Suborder: Pleocyemata
- Infraorder: Caridea
- Family: Crangonidae
- Genus: Crangon; Fabricius, 1798 [non Weber, 1795]

Type species
- Crangon crangon Linnaeus, 1758

Synonyms
- Bannikovia Garassino & Teruzzi, 1996; Crago Lamarck, 1801; Crangon (Crangon) Fabricius, 1798; Crangonus Rafinesque, 1815; Longitergite Garassino & Teruzzi, 1996; Steiracrangon Kinahan, 1862

= Crangon =

Genus of crustaceans

Crangon is a genus of shrimp.

== Distribution ==
Crangon species are found exclusively in the Northern Hemisphere, with most of the species occurring in the northern Pacific Ocean. C. septemspinosa is the only species in the genus to occur in the north-western Atlantic Ocean, while in the north-eastern Atlantic, C. crangon and C. allmani occur. With the exception of the important commercial species C. crangon, however, the distributions of Crangon species are poorly characterised. The greater number of species in the Pacific Ocean is thought to indicate that the genus originated in the Pacific.

== Species ==
Crangon contains the following extant species:

- Crangon affinis De Haan, 1849
- Crangon alaskensis Lockington, 1877
- Crangon alba Holmes, 1900
- Crangon allmani Kinahan, 1860
- Crangon amurensis Bražnikov, 1907
- Crangon capensis Stimpson, 1860
- Crangon cassiope De Man, 1906
- Crangon crangon (Linnaeus, 1758)
- Crangon dalli Rathbun, 1902
- Crangon franciscorum Stimpson, 1856
- Crangon hakodatei Rathbun, 1902
- Crangon handi Kuris & Carlton, 1977
- Crangon holmesi Rathbun, 1902
- Crangon lockingtonii Holmes, 1904
- †Crangon miocenicus (Garassino & Teruzzi, 1996)
- Crangon nigricauda Stimpson, 1856
- Crangon nigromaculata Lockington, 1877
- Crangon propinquus Stimpson, 1860
- Crangon septemspinosa Say, 1818
- Crangon uritai Hayashi & J. N. Kim, 1999

A further two species are known from the fossil record.
