= Neocrangon =

Scientific classification
- Domain: Eukaryota
- Kingdom: Animalia
- Phylum: Arthropoda
- Class: Malacostraca
- Order: Decapoda
- Suborder: Pleocyemata
- Infraorder: Caridea
- Family: Crangonidae
- Genus: Neocrangon; Zarenkov, 1965

Genus of crustaceans

Neocrangon is a genus of crustaceans belonging to the family Crangonidae.

Its native range is Northern America and Japan.

Species:

- Neocrangon abyssorum (Rathbun, 1902)
- Neocrangon communis (Rathbun, 1899)
- Neocrangon geniculata (Yokoya, 1933)
- Neocrangon joloensis (Deman, 1929)
- Neocrangon joloensis (de Man, 1929)
- Neocrangon resima (Rathbun, 1902)
- Neocrangon sagamiensis (Balss, 1913)
