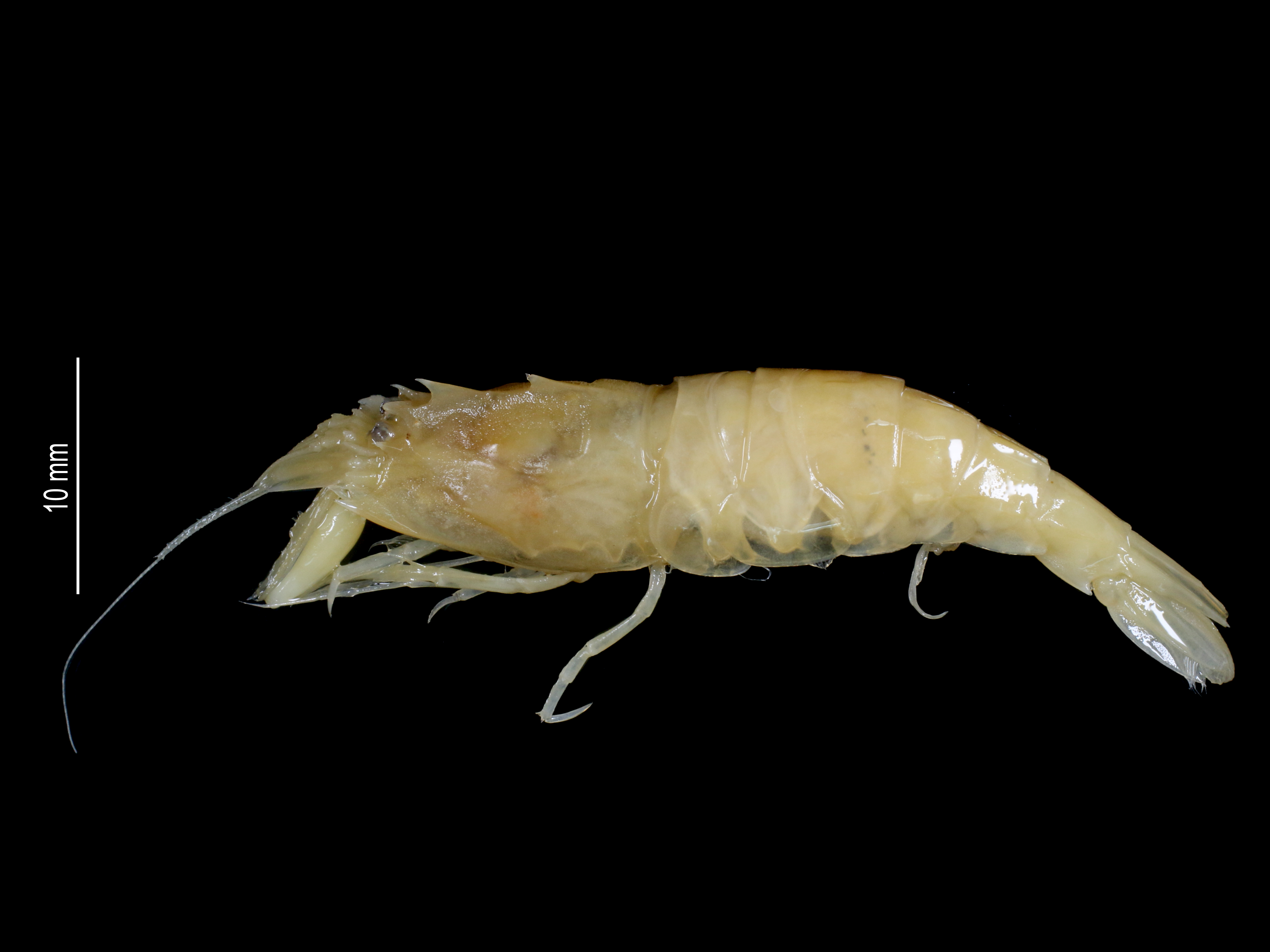
- Metacrangon clevai

Scientific classification
- Domain: Eukaryota
- Kingdom: Animalia
- Phylum: Arthropoda
- Class: Malacostraca
- Order: Decapoda
- Suborder: Pleocyemata
- Infraorder: Caridea
- Family: Crangonidae
- Genus: Metacrangon; Zarenkov, 1965

= Metacrangon =

Genus of shrimp

Metacrangon is a genus of shrimp belonging to the family Crangonidae.

The genus has cosmopolitan distribution.

== Species ==
There are a total of 46 species:

- Metacrangon acclivis (Rathbun, 1902)
- Metacrangon agassizii (Smith, 1882)
- Metacrangon asiaticus (Kobjakova, 1955)
- Metacrangon australis Komai & Taylor, 2010
- Metacrangon bahamondei Retamal & Gorny, 2003
- Metacrangon bellmarleyi (Stebbing, 1914)
- Metacrangon bythos Komai, 2012
- Metacrangon clevai Komai, 2012
- Metacrangon cornuta Komai & Komatsu, 2009
- Metacrangon crosnieri Komai, 1997
- Metacrangon haona Komai & Ahyong, 2011
- Metacrangon hayashii Kim & Chan, 2020
- Metagrangon hikurangi Komai & Ahyong, 2011
- Metacrangon holthuisi Komai, 2010
- Metacrangon jacqueti (A. Milne-Edwards, 1881)
- Metacrangon kaiko Komai, Chen & Watanabe, 2018
- Metacrangon karubar Komai, 2012
- Metacrangon knoxi (Yaldwyn, 1960)
- Metacrangon laevis (Yokoya, 1933)
- Matacrangon latirostris Komai & Chan, 2020
- Metacrangon longirostris (Yokoya, 1933)
- Metacrangon miyakei Kim, 2005
- Metacrangon monodon (Birstein & Vinogradox, 1951)
- Metacrangon munita (Dana, 1852)
- Metacrangon nipponensis (Yokoya, 1933)
- Metacrangon novaguinea Kim & Chan, 2020
- Metacrangon obliqua Komai, 2012
- Metacrangon ochotensis (Kobjakova, 1955)
- Metacrangon poorei Komai & Taylor, 2010
- Metacrangon procax (Faxon, 1893)
- Metacrangon proxima Kim, 2005
- Metacrangon punctata Komai, 2012
- Metacrangon rau Komai & Ahyong, 2011
- Metacrangon richardsoni (Yaldwyn, 1960)
- Metacrangon robusta (Kobjakova, 1935)
- Metacrangon ryukyu Komai, Chen & Watanabe, 2018
- Metacrangon similis Komai, 1997
- Metacrangon sinensis Fujino & Miyake, 1970
- Metacrangon spinidorsalis Komai & Taylor, 2010
- Metacrangon spinirostris (Rathbun, 1902)
- Metacrangon spinosissima (Rathbun, 1902)
- Metacrangon teina Komai & Ahyong, 2011
- Metacrangon trigonorostris (Yokoya, 1933)
- Metacrangon tropis Komai, 2012
- Metacrangon tsugaruensis Komai, 2012
- Metacrangon variabilis (Rathbun, 1902)
