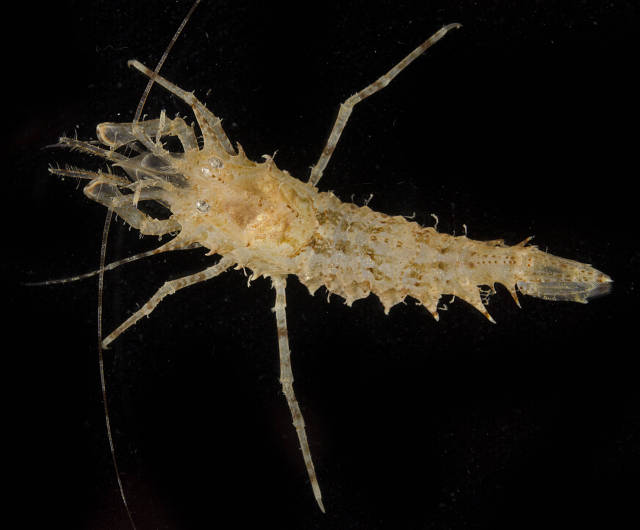
- P. echinada

Scientific classification
- Domain: Eukaryota
- Kingdom: Animalia
- Phylum: Arthropoda
- Class: Malacostraca
- Order: Decapoda
- Suborder: Pleocyemata
- Infraorder: Caridea
- Family: Crangonidae
- Genus: Paracrangon; Dana, 1852

Type species
- Paracrangon echinada Dana, 1852

Species
- see text
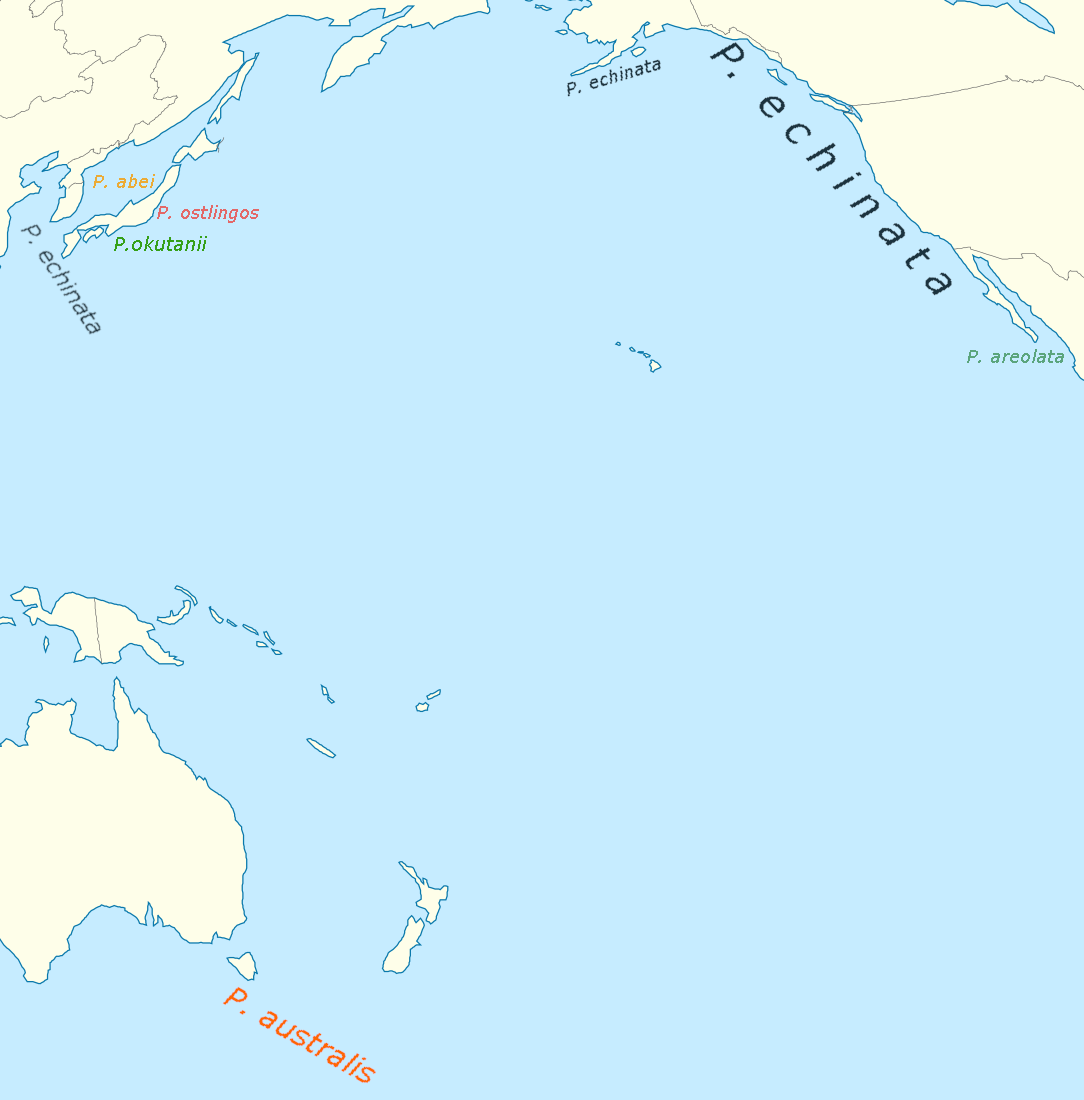

= Paracrangon =

Genus of shrimp

Paracrangon is a genus of deep-sea shrimp in the family Crangonidae, found on the Pacific coasts of North America, Asia, and Australia. Morphologically, they are notable for several autapomorphies, most significantly their unique lack of second pereopods, but also for their partially flexible abdomen, which allows them to assume their defensive cataleptic posture. Species also have long spines covering their carapace. They are distinctive among the Crangonid shrimp, and are almost certainly monophyletic. All species except Paracrangon echinata, the type species, are quite rare.

== Appearance ==
Paracrangon species lack their second pereopods, and, as they are often used for grooming, their absence may explain why they are frequently found covered with detritus, hydroids, and bryozoans. This may help them camouflage themselves in their surroundings. In some species (P. furcata, P. ostlingos), the second pereiopods are completely absent, while in all other species they are represented by small buds. Paracrangon species are slightly compressed laterally, have free eyes, and an elongated rostrum that is relatively slender and sub-erect. Their carapaces are strongly sculptured, and their bodies are covered with short, curved setae.

The cataleptic posture, also assumed by some other shrimp, is a defensive posture in which the abdomen of the shrimp is flexed upwards at nearly a 45° degree angle, exposing their spines to any predators.

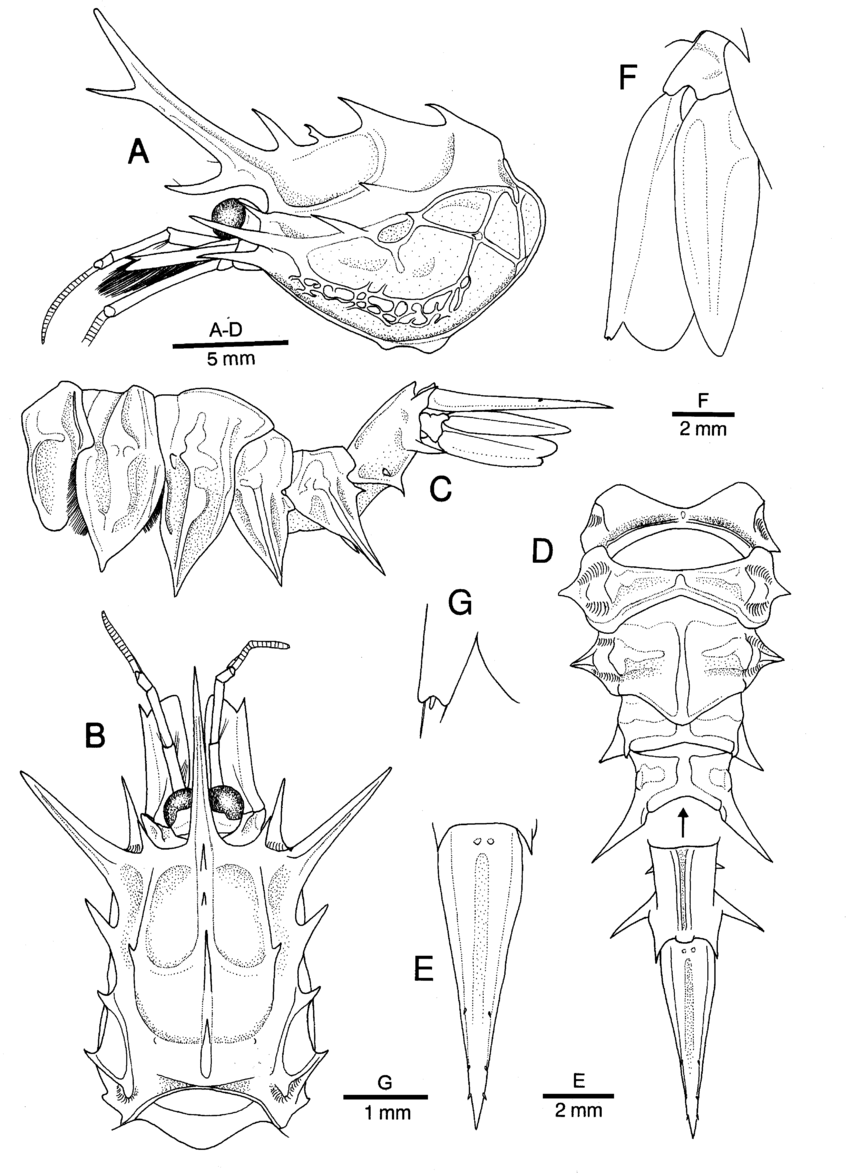
P. okutanii

== Species ==
Paracrangon comprises the following species:

- P. abei
- P. areolata
- P. australis
- P. echinata
- P. furcata
- P. okutanii
- P. ostlingos

=== Paracrangon echinata ===
Paracrangon echinata is also known as the horned or spiked shrimp, and is the most common and widespread species.

P. echinata is usually brownish in colour, with darker spots. It is most closely related to P. abei. It is found in water depths ranging from sublittoral to 1,380 metres (4,530 ft). It was first described from Puget Sound in the Salish sea, but is found along the North American Pacific coast as far north as Alaska but no farther south than La Jolla, California; and, in Asian waters, in the seas of Japan and Okhotsk as well as the strait of Korea. The pollexes on their first pereiopods are unusually long, and articulate with their palms. The third pair of pereipods is very fine, and serve a sensory function similar to antennae. They are used to detect prey and probe the shrimp's surroundings.

==== Feeding habits ====
A 2011 study found that P. echinata is a lie-in-wait predator, feeding on smaller organisms, primarily amphipods (which constitute over 40% of the diet), polychaetes, and other carideans. The shrimp first detects its prey with its thin pair of third pereiopods, then grabs the prey with its first pair.
