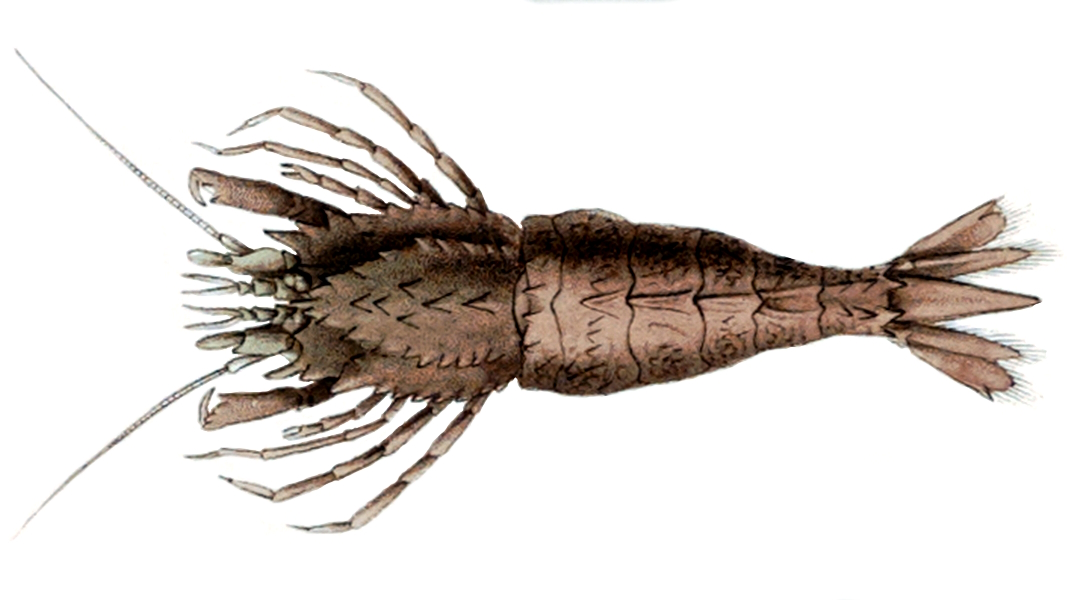
- Aegaeon cataphractus

Scientific classification
- Kingdom: Animalia
- Phylum: Arthropoda
- Clade: Pancrustacea
- Class: Malacostraca
- Order: Decapoda
- Suborder: Pleocyemata
- Infraorder: Caridea
- Family: Crangonidae
- Genus: Aegaeon; Agassiz, 1846

Type species
- Cancer cataphractus Olivi, 1792

= Aegaeon (crustacean) =

Aegaeon Temporal range: 0.012–0 Ma

Genus of crustaceans

Aegaeon is a genus of shrimp in the family Crangonidae, with species living in waters from 6 to 1413 meters deep.

== Species ==
There are five species in Aegaeon:

- Aegaeon boschii Christoffersen, 1988
- Aegaeon cataphractus (Olivi, 1792)
- Aegaeon lacazei (Gourret, 1887)
- Aegaeon orientalis Henderson, 1893
- Aegaeon rathbuni de Man, 1918
