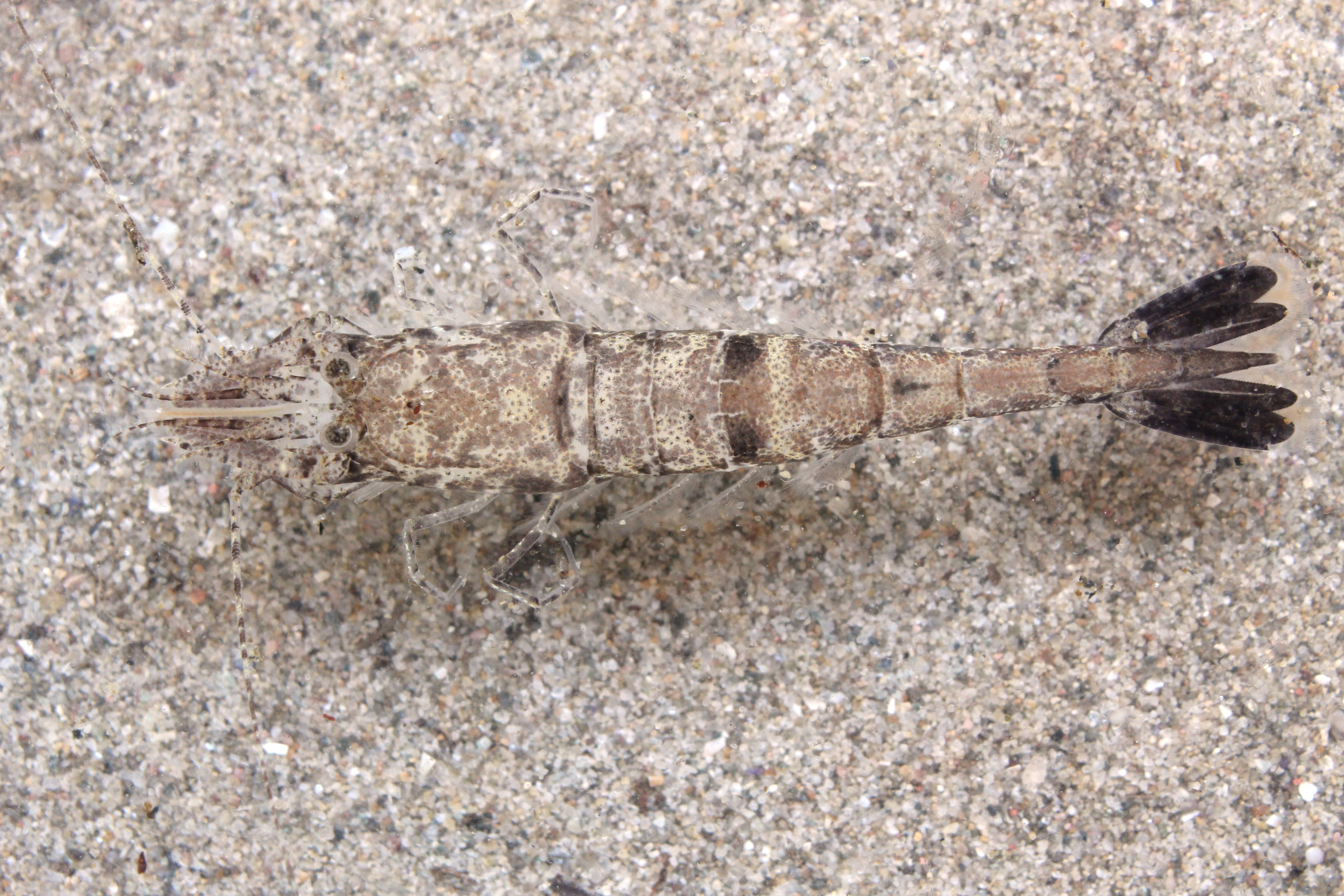

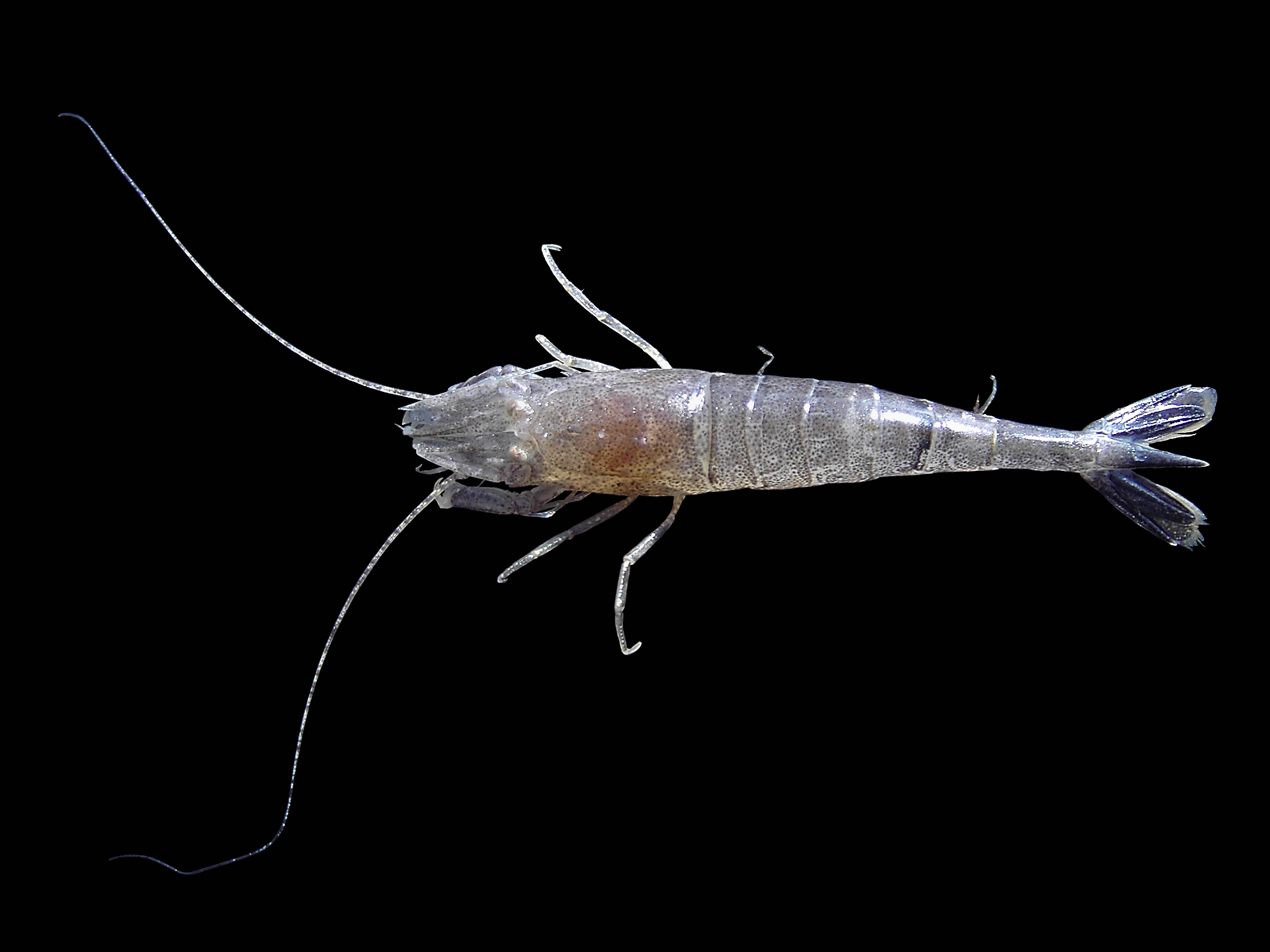

Scientific classification
- Kingdom: Animalia
- Phylum: Arthropoda
- Clade: Pancrustacea
- Class: Malacostraca
- Order: Decapoda
- Suborder: Pleocyemata
- Infraorder: Caridea
- Family: Crangonidae
- Genus: Crangon
- Species: C. crangon

Binomial name
- Crangon crangon (Linnaeus, 1758)

Synonyms
- List: Astacus crangon (Linnaeus, 1758); Cancer crangon Linnaeus, 1758; Crago vulgaris (Fabricius, 1798); Crangon maculatus Marcusen, 1867; Crangon maculosa Rathke, 1837; Crangon rubropunctatus Risso, 1816; Crangon vulgaris Fabricius, 1798; Steiracrangon orientalis Czerniavsky, 1884

= Crangon crangon =

Species of shrimp

Crangon crangon is a species of caridean shrimp found across the northeastern Atlantic Ocean. Its range extends from the White Sea in the north of Russia to the coast of Morocco, including the Baltic Sea, and appears also throughout the Mediterranean and Black Seas. Commercially important, it is fished mainly in the southern North Sea. Common names include brown shrimp, common shrimp, bay shrimp, and sand shrimp, while translation of its French name crevette grise (or its Dutch equivalent grijze garnaal) sometimes leads to the English version grey shrimp. The generic and specific names derive from krangṓn (κραγγών), an Ancient Greek word for shrimp.

== Description ==
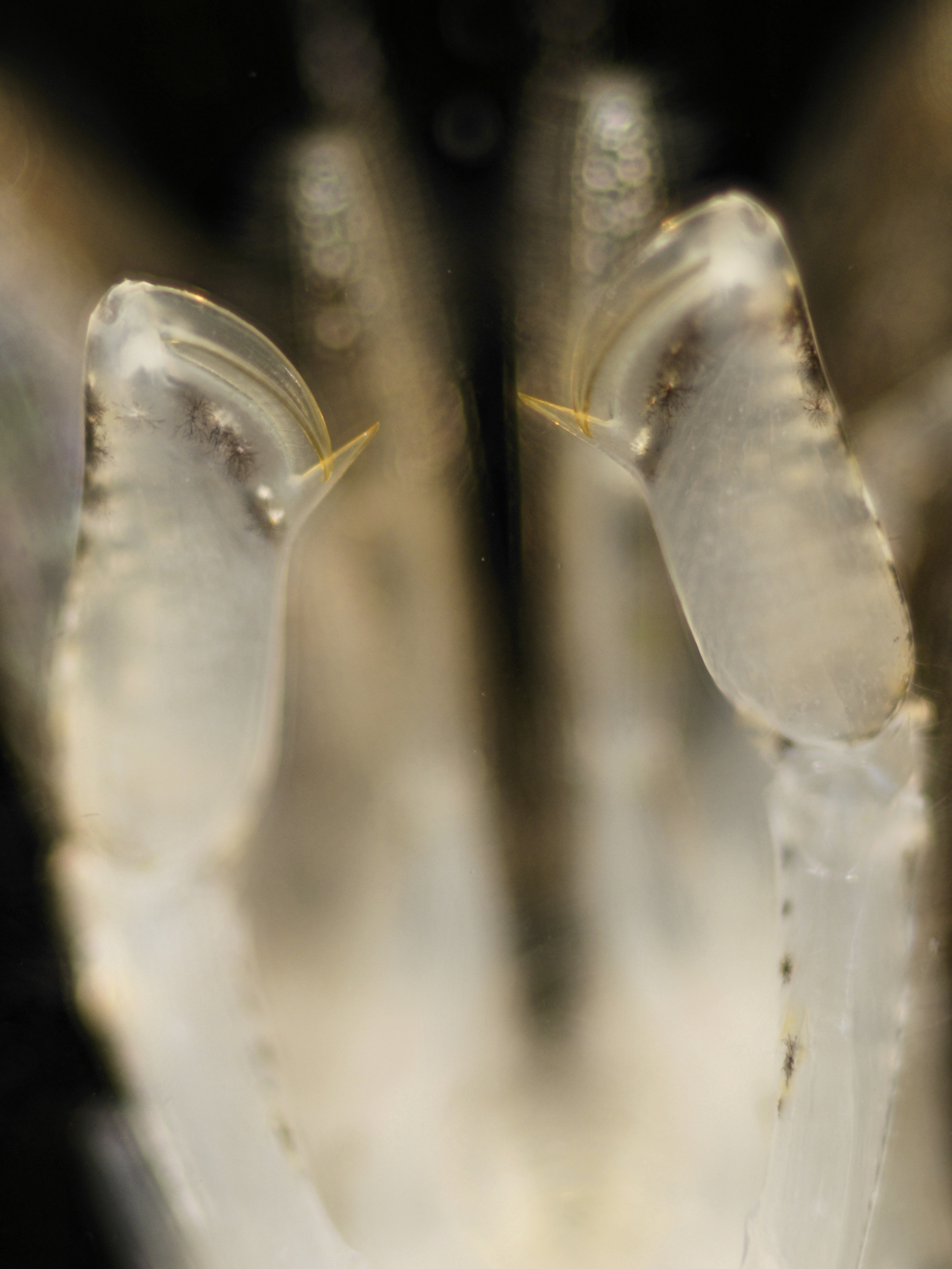
The chelae of C. crangon from below

Adults are typically 30–50 mm (1.2–2.0 in) long, although individuals up to 90 mm (3.5 in) have been recorded. The animals have cryptic colouration, being a sandy brown colour, which can be changed to match the environment.

Crangon is classified in the family Crangonidae, and shares the family's characteristic subchelate first pereiopods (where the movable finger closes onto a short projection rather than a similarly sized, fixed "finger") and short rostrum.

They live in shallow water, which can also be slightly brackish, and feed nocturnally. During the day, they remain buried in the sand to escape predatory birds and fish, with only their antennae protruding.

== Distribution and ecology ==
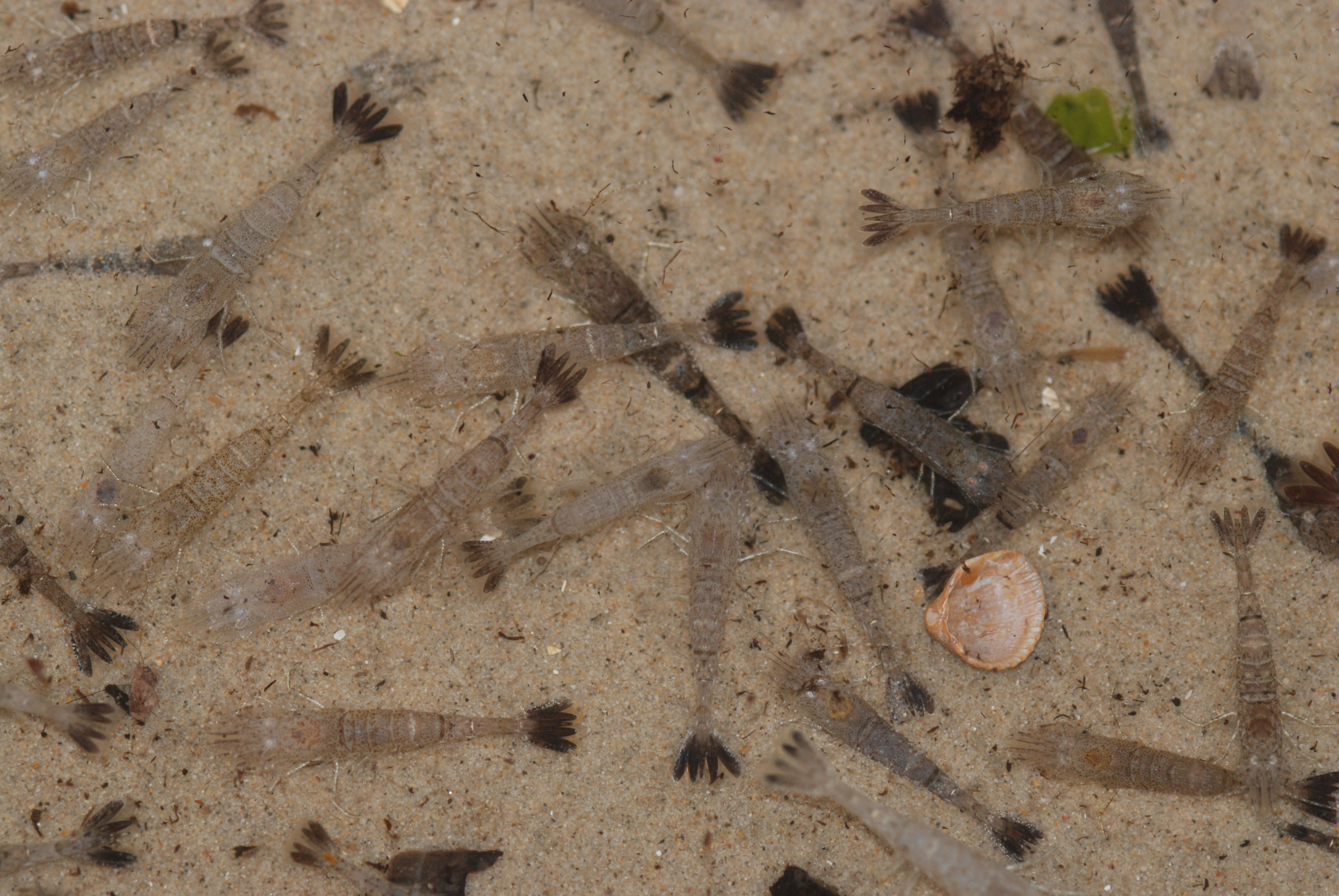
Aggregation

C. crangon has a wide range, extending across the northeastern Atlantic Ocean from the White Sea in the north of Russia to the coast of Morocco, including the Baltic Sea, as well as occurring throughout the Mediterranean and Black Seas. Despite its wide range, however, little gene flow occurs across certain natural barriers, such as the Strait of Gibraltar or the Bosphorus. The populations in the western Mediterranean Sea are thought to be the oldest, with the species' spread across the north Atlantic thought to postdate the Pleistocene.

Adults live epibenthically (on or near the sea floor) especially in the shallow waters of estuaries or near the coast. It is generally highly abundant, and has a significant effect on the ecosystems where it lives.

== Lifecycle ==
Females reach sexual maturity at a length around 22–43 mm (0.87–1.69 in), while males are mature at 30–45 mm (1.2–1.8 in). The young hatch from their eggs into planktonic larvae. These pass through five moults before reaching the postlarval stage, when they settle to the sea-floor.

== Relation to humans ==
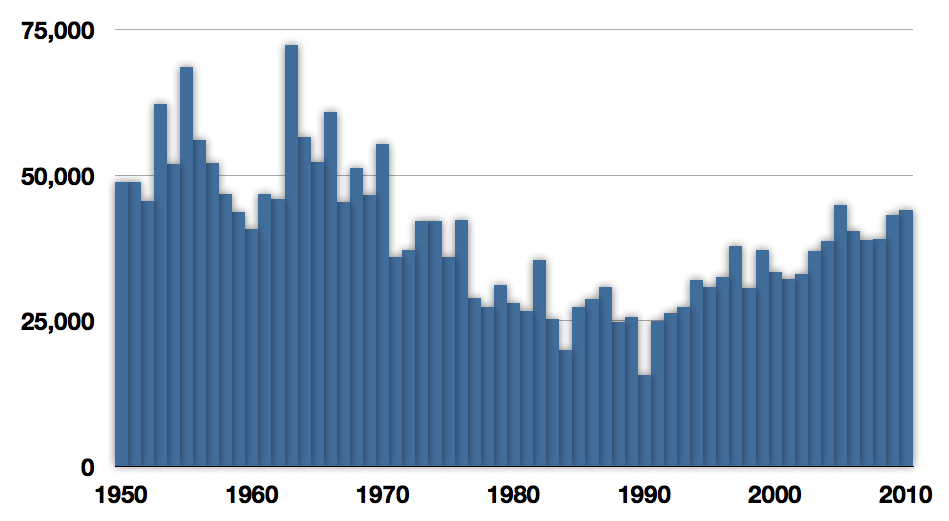
Global capture of C. crangon in tonnes reported by the FAO, 1950–2010

Historically, the commercial fishery was accomplished by horse-drawn beam trawls on both sides of the Dover straits. In the sandy shallows of Morecambe Bay (Lancashire, UK) horses have been replaced by tractors. Some small fishing vessels also use beam trawls for brown shrimp. A few artisanal fishermen use hand-pushed nets. In all UK shrimp fisheries, the catch is first 'riddled' to release the young of shrimps and fish. The shrimps are then traditionally boiled on board before landing.

Over 37,000 t (82 million lb) of C. crangon were caught in 1999, with Germany and the Netherlands taking over 80% of this total.

The UK lands an annual average of 1000 tonnes of brown shrimp, but the catch is highly variable between 500 and 1500 tonnes. In the Lancashire fishery for brown shrimp it has been shown that landings in any year are related to the annual catch, average annual air temperature (inverse) and total rainfall in the previous year. That has enabled a good prediction of annual landings one year in advance. Moreover, for the port of Lytham, the abundance of shrimp (annual catch per unit effort) was found to be closely correlated with the mean annual Zürich sunspot number for the period 1965-1975. Given that sunspot numbers are predictable, this provides another tool for the prediction of annual shrimp catch. Sunspot cycle No. 23 (1997–2008) is a good example of the correlation between UK annual brown shrimp catch and mean annual sunspot number.

Greenpeace Germany classifies the brown shrimp as an "unsustainable" choice that should be avoided. Brown shrimp have been documented to contain microplastics.

=== As food ===
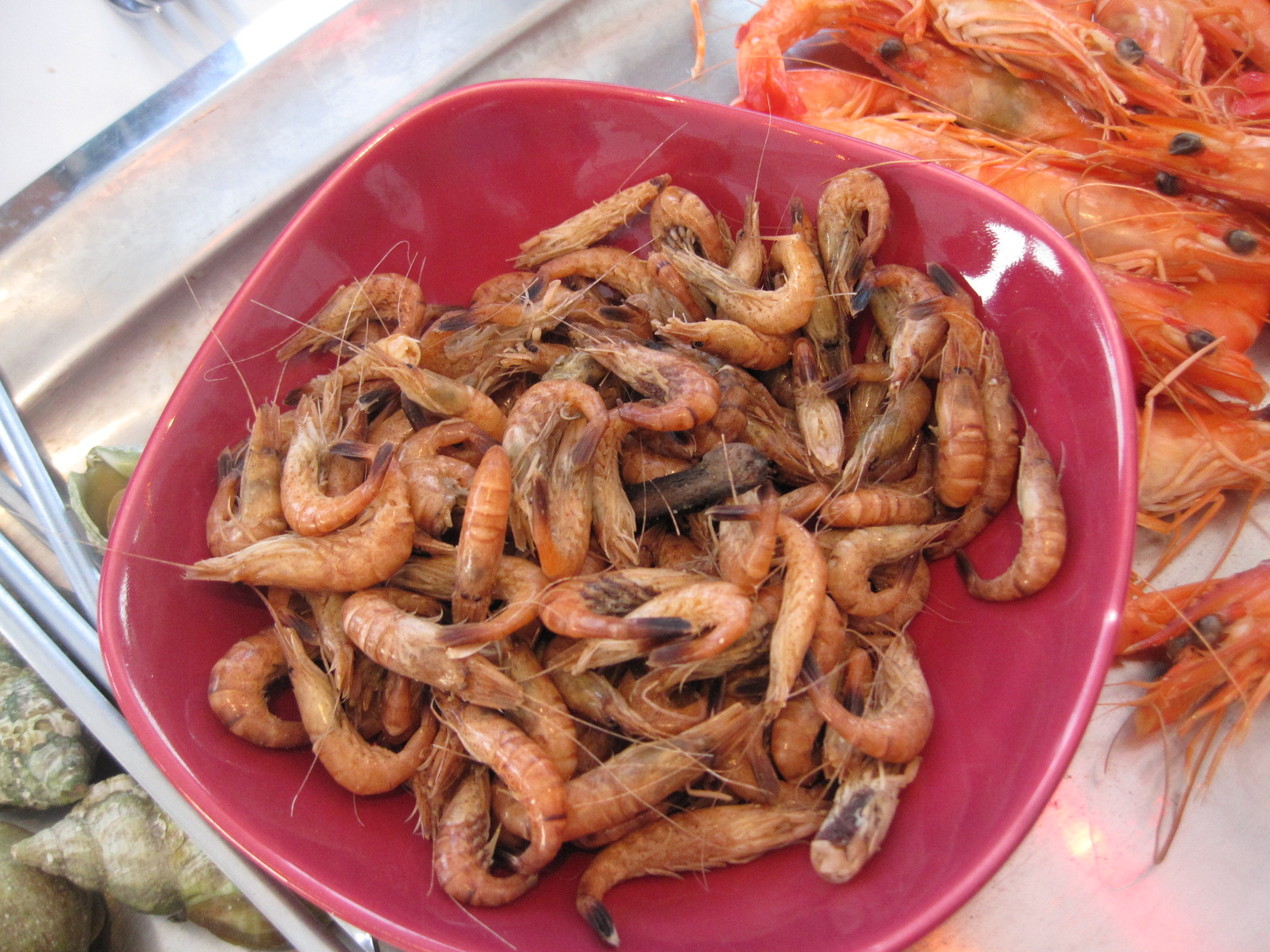
A bowl of brown shrimp served as a snack

The consumption of brown shrimp is popular in Belgium, the Netherlands, northern Germany, and Denmark.

Shrimp in general are known as garnalen in Dutch. It is the basis of the dish tomate-crevettes, where the shrimp are mixed with mayonnaise and fresh parsley, and served in a hollowed-out uncooked tomato. The shrimp croquette is another Belgian speciality; the shrimp are in the interior of the battered croquette along with béchamel sauce. Freshly cooked, unpeeled brown shrimp are often served as a snack accompanying beer, typically a sour ale or Flemish red such as Rodenbach.

In Lancashire, England, the peeled brown shrimps are mixed with butter and spices (including nutmeg or mace) to make potted shrimps, a dish traditionally eaten with bread.
