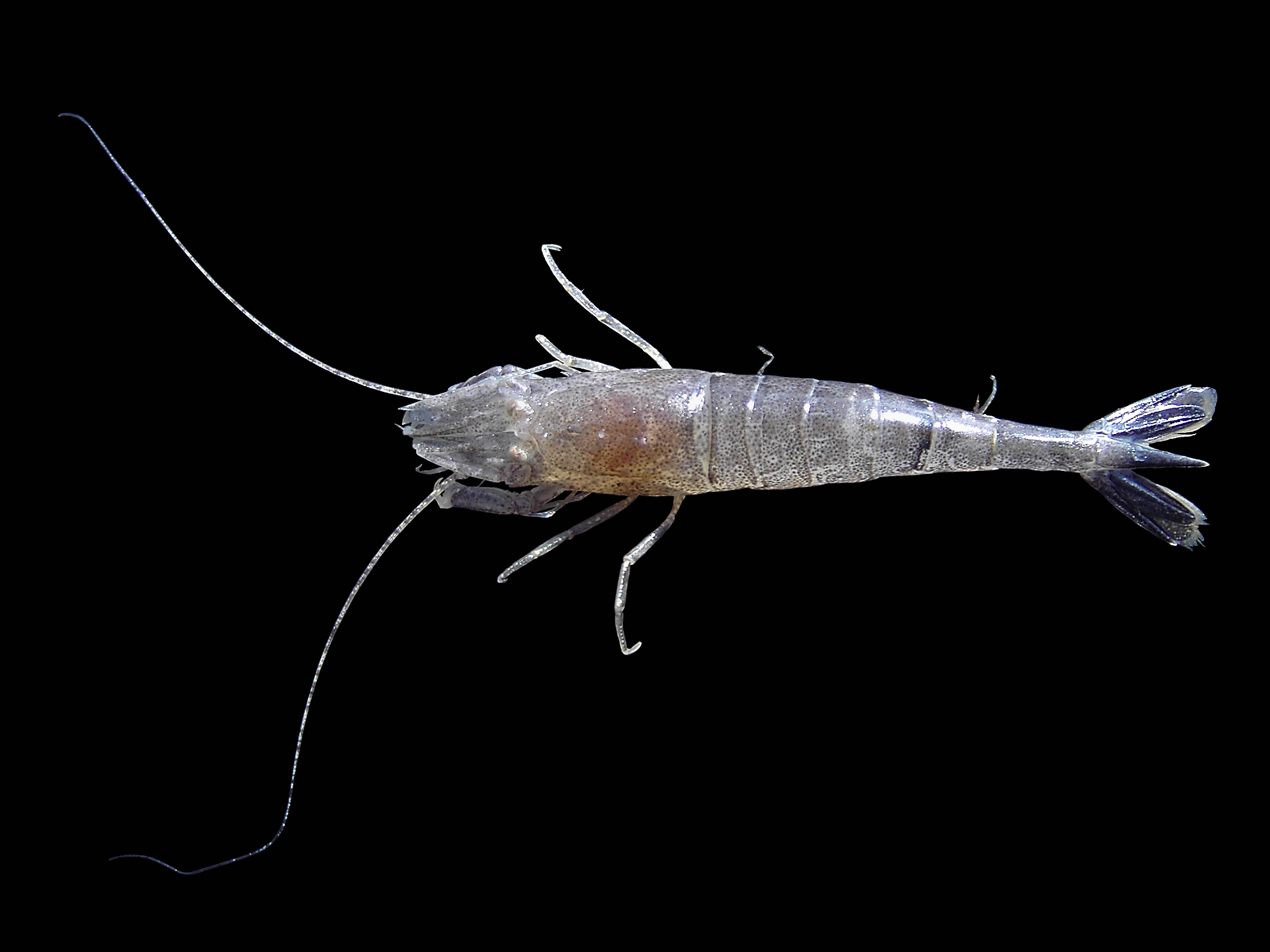
- Crangon crangon

Scientific classification
- Kingdom: Animalia
- Phylum: Arthropoda
- Clade: Pancrustacea
- Class: Malacostraca
- Order: Decapoda
- Suborder: Pleocyemata
- Infraorder: Caridea
- Superfamily: Crangonoidea
- Family: Crangonidae; Haworth, 1825

Genera
- See text

= Crangonidae =

Crangonidae Temporal range: Early Eocene–Recent

Family of crustaceans

Crangonidae is a family of shrimp, of the superfamily Crangonoidea, including the commercially important species Crangon crangon. Its type genus is Crangon. Crangonid shrimps' first pair of pereiopods have partially chelate claws that they use to capture their prey. They burrow shallowly into sediment on the sea floor, and feed on bivalves, crustaceans, polychaetes, and some small fish.

Two fossil species are known: Crangon miocenicus, discovered in 2001 in the early Miocene of the north Caucasus in Russia, and Morscrangon acutus, discovered in 2006 in the fur formation (early Eocene) in Denmark.

Twenty-four genera are included in the family:

- Aegaeon Agassiz, 1846
- Argis Krøyer, 1842
- Crangon Fabricius, 1798
- Lissocrangon Kuris & Carlton, 1977
- Lissosabinea Christoffersen, 1988
- Mesocrangon Zarenkov, 1965
- Metacrangon Zarenkov, 1965
- †Morscrangon Garassino & Jakobsen, 2005
- Neocrangon Zarenkov, 1965
- Notocrangon Coutière, 1900
- Paracrangon Dana, 1852a
- Parapontocaris Alcock, 1901
- Parapontophilus Christoffersen, 1988
- Philocheras Stebbing, 1900
- Placopsicrangon Komai & Chan, 2009
- Pontocaris Bate, 1888
- Pontophilus Leach, 1817
- Pseudopontophilus Komai, 2004
- Prionocrangon Wood-Mason & Alcock, 1891
- Rhynocrangon Zarenkov, 1965
- Sabinea J. C. Ross, 1835
- Sclerocrangon Sars, 1883
- Syncrangon Kim & Hayashi, 2003
- Vercoia Baker, 1904
