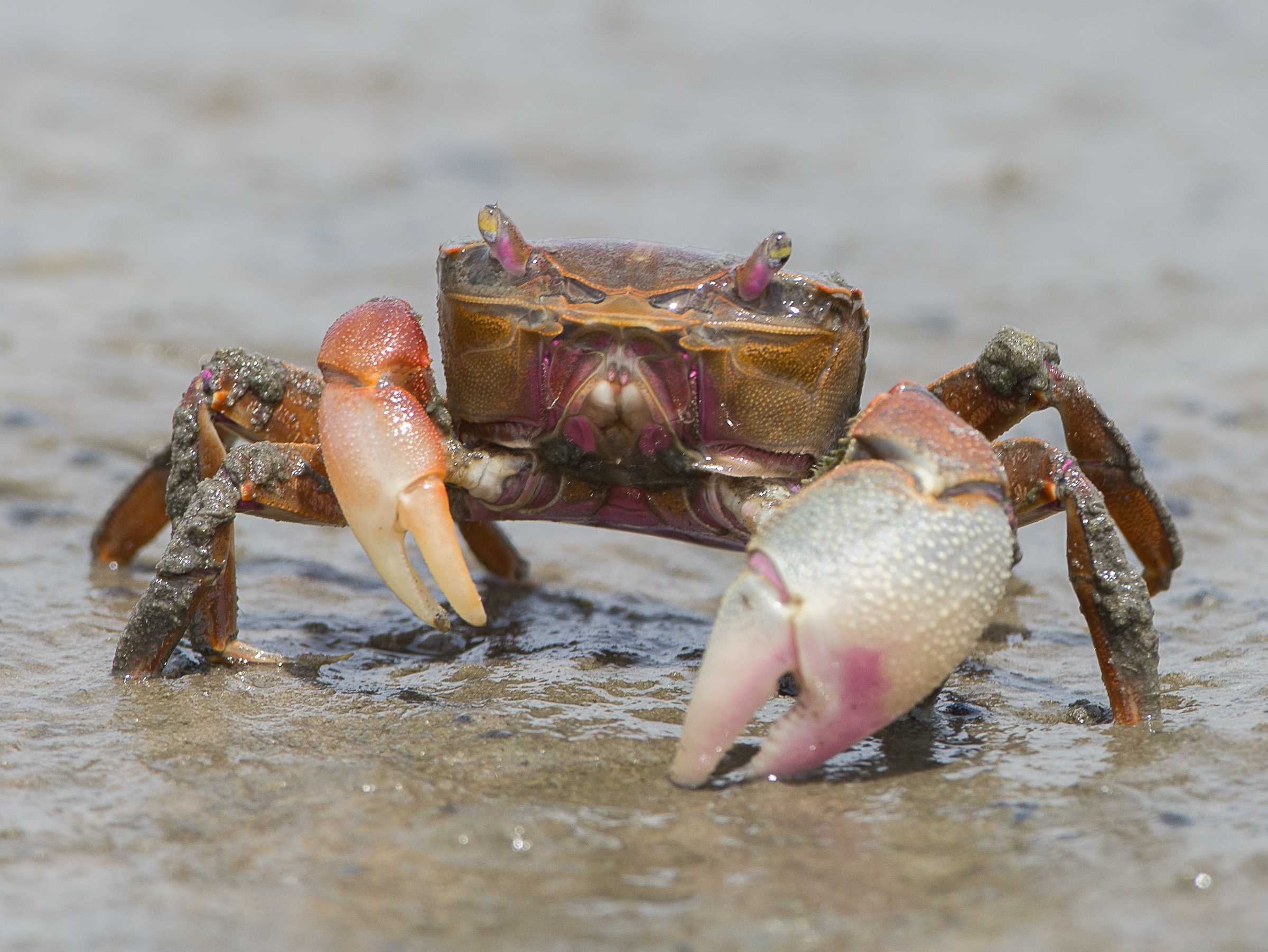

Scientific classification
- Domain: Eukaryota
- Kingdom: Animalia
- Phylum: Arthropoda
- Class: Malacostraca
- Order: Decapoda
- Suborder: Pleocyemata
- Infraorder: Brachyura
- Family: Varunidae
- Subfamily: Cyclograpsinae
- Genus: Neohelice; K. Sakai, Türkay & Yang, 2006
- Species: N. granulata

Binomial name
- Neohelice granulata (Dana, 1851)

Synonyms
- Chasmagnathus granulata Dana, 1851; Helice gaudichaudi H. Milne-Edwards, 1853

= Neohelice =

Genus of crabs

Neohelice granulata is a species of crab in the family Varunidae, and the only species in the genus Neohelice. In 2009, it was estimated that N. granulata was the sixth most studied species of crab.

== Distribution and ecology ==
Neohelice is found in the south-western Atlantic Ocean, from the Laguna Araruama in Rio de Janeiro state, Brazil to the Golfo San José (on the north side of the Valdes Peninsula in Patagonia, Argentina). The diet of Neohelice in the wild most consists of sediment, Spartina and plant-derived detritus.

== Taxonomic history ==
The first report of Neohelice was probably that made by Alcide d'Orbigny during an expedition to South America between 1826 and 1834. He included details of the crab's ecology, including their burrows, but did not name the species. The first person to describe the species taxonomically was James Dwight Dana, who named it Chasmagnathus granulatus in his 1851 work reporting the results of the United States Exploring Expedition (also known as the "Wilkes expedition"). In 1918, Mary J. Rathbun redescribed the species under the modified name "Chasmagnathus granulata", which remained in occasional use along Dana's name until 2006, when Katushi Sakai, Michael Türkay and Si-Liang Yang revised the genera Helice and Chasmagnathus. They restricted both genera to those species occurring in East Asia, and erected a new genus for C. granulatus, which thus became Neohelice granulata, as well as the genera Austrohelice and Pseudohelice.

== Importance ==
Neohelice granulata has emerged since the 1980s as a model species in a variety of biological fields. Much of the scientific research has focused on the species' tolerance of both fresh water and brine (euryhalinity) and its semiterrestrial habit. It has also been investigated for research into neurophysiology, neurobiology of learning and memory, toxicology and ecosystem dynamics. Such breadth of study is unusual for a model organism. In 2009, Eduardo Spivak tallied the number of scientific papers published about different crab species over the previous 23 years, and found that Neohelice granulata was the sixth most studied crab species, after Carcinus maenas, Callinectes sapidus, Scylla serrata, Cancer pagurus and Metacarcinus magister, but ahead of the invasive and edible Chinese mitten crab (Eriocheir sinensis) and the commercially important "snow crab", Chionoecetes opilio.
