= Pseudohelice annamalai =

Scientific classification
- Kingdom: Animalia
- Phylum: Arthropoda
- Clade: Pancrustacea
- Class: Malacostraca
- Order: Decapoda
- Suborder: Pleocyemata
- Infraorder: Brachyura
- Superfamily: Grapsoidea
- Family: Varunidae
- Subfamily: Cyclograpsinae
- Genus: Pseudohelice; K. Sakai, Türkay & Yang, 2006
- Species: P. annamalai

Binomial name
- Pseudohelice annamalai Prema et al., 2022

Species of crab

Pseudohelice annamalai is a species of crab in the family Varunidae, which is reported from the Indian Ocean at the mangroves of Parangipettai near the Vellar River estuary in Cuddalore district, Tamil Nadu.

== Biology ==
Pseudohelice annamalai is distinguished from other species of the genus by having a dark purple to dark grey colour, with irregular light brown, yellowish brown, or white patches on the posterior carapace. Chelipeds are light brown in colour. It grows a maximum width of up to 20 mm. The species inhabits muddy banks of mangroves. Their burrows are located near the pneumatophores of Avicennia mangroves. The depth of the burrows are about 25 to 30 cm. They are branched, with larger pellets kept around the entrance. Unlike other intertidal crabs, this crab is not aggressive.
