= Smooth shore crab =

The common name smooth shore crab may apply to more than one species:

- Cyclograpsus lavauxi, from New Zealand
- Cyclograpsus granulosus, from Australia
