= Cyclograpsus henshawi =

Scientific classification
- Kingdom: Animalia
- Phylum: Arthropoda
- Clade: Pancrustacea
- Class: Malacostraca
- Order: Decapoda
- Suborder: Pleocyemata
- Infraorder: Brachyura
- Family: Varunidae
- Genus: Cyclograpsus
- Species: C. henshawi

Binomial name
- Cyclograpsus henshawi Rathburn, 1902

Species of crab

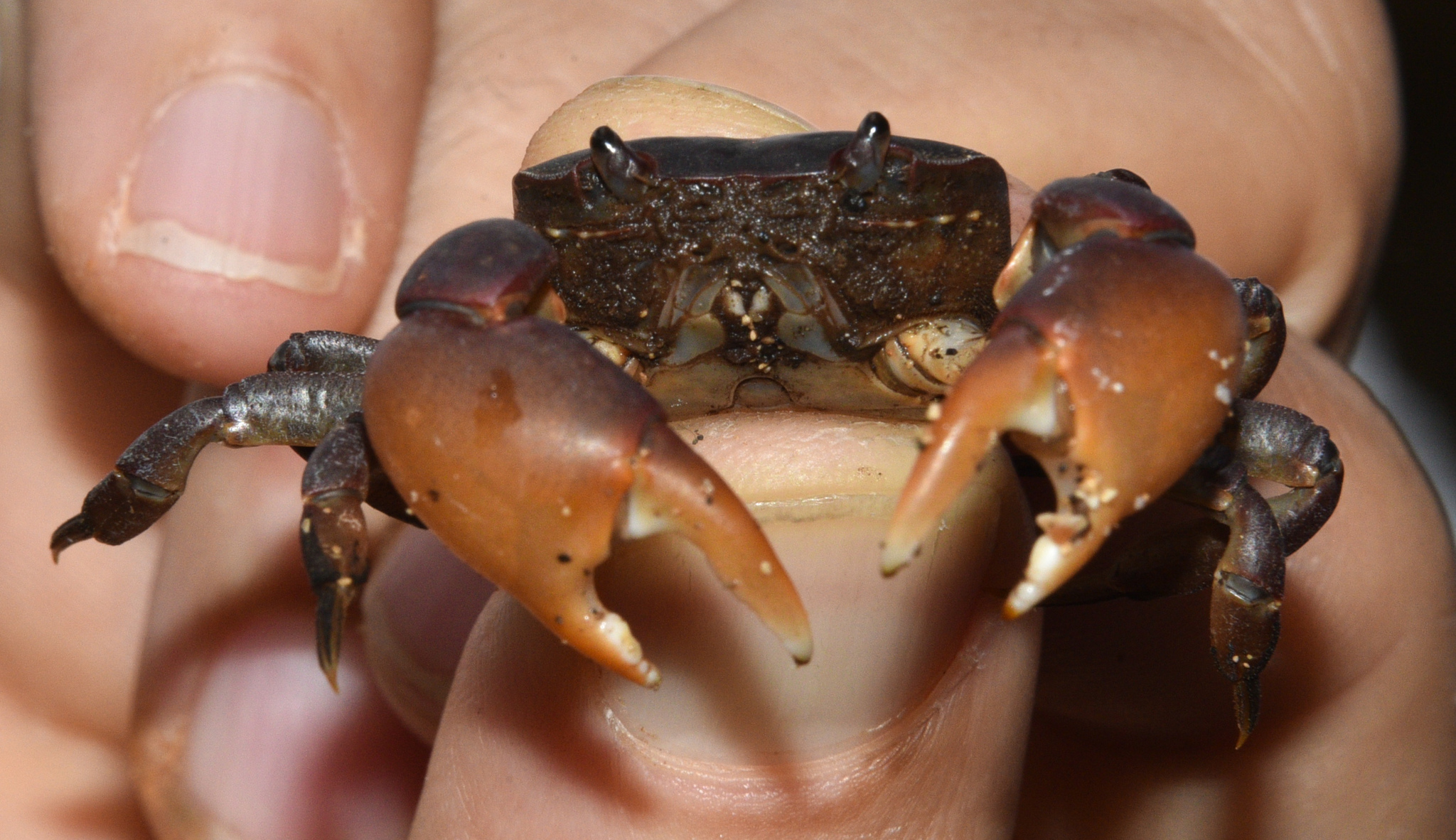
Front view of Cyclograpsus henshawi (2018)

Cyclograpsus henshawi is a marine crab of the family Varunidae. Zoologist Mary J. Rathbun named the species in 1902 after Mr. H. W. Henshaw, who collected the first specimens from Hilo, Hawaii. This species is also referred to as Henshaw’s Shore Crab and is endemic to the Hawaiian Islands.

== Anatomy ==
The largest male specimen recorded measures 16mm long by 19.5mm wide while an average male specimen measures 13.5 mm long by 17mm wide.

=== Carapace ===
The carapace of the Henshaw’s Shore Crab measures 3/4" wide and is noticeably broad as opposed to long. Their carapace is 4/5th as long as they are wide and has a smooth texture with microscopic holes. The front of the carapace is turned down, creating a sharp, straight edge. There are six white spots located on the front half. Its fronto-orbital width is 11.7mm, and its front width is 6.2mm.The front and anterolateral regions are covered in spikes, faint sutures, and small granules. The carapace's sides are smooth and parallel. Male specimens also have abdomens that curve inwards.

The species is distinguished from related species (i.e., Cyclograpsus granulosus and Cyclograpsus cinereus) by its smoother carapace and different male abdomen shape. It most closely resembles C. Parvulus De Man but differs in frontal width and proportions.

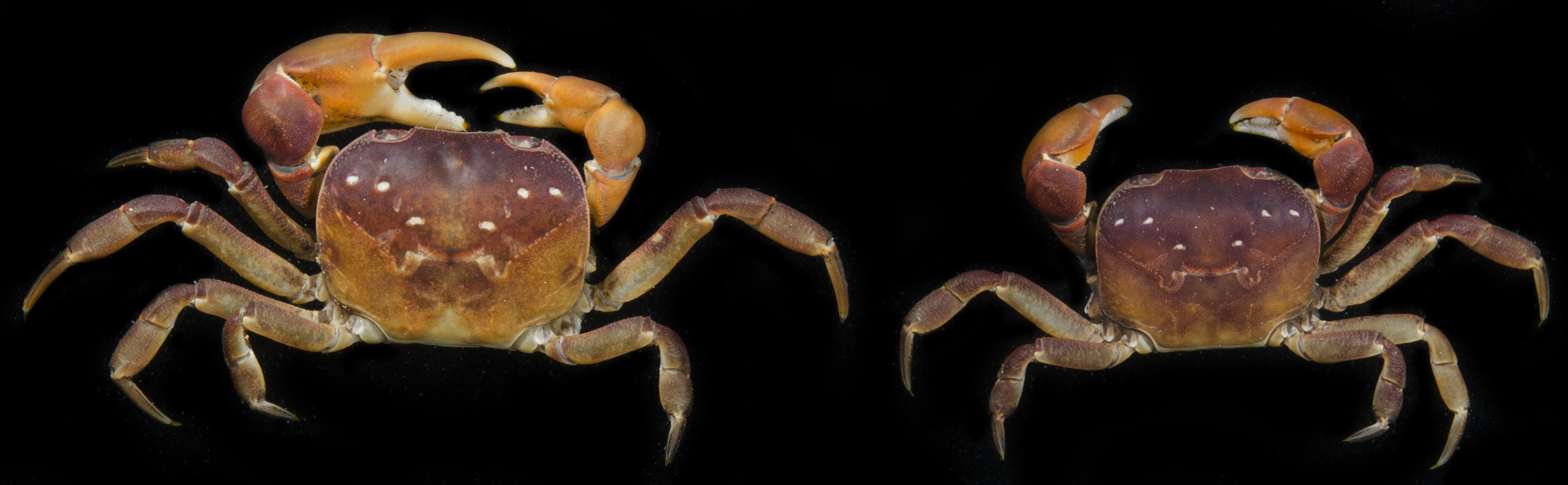
Top view of the Henshaw's Shore Crab provided by the Smithsonian Institution: National Museum of Natural History(1902)

=== Cheliped ===
Its chelipeds are nearly equal in size with granules on the margins and slightly gaping fingers. Its fingers are slightly opened and contain miniature teeth, with more prominent teeth on their pollex. Both its chelipeds and fingers are smooth. Male specimens have significantly larger chelipeds compared to female specimens.

=== Leg ===
Its legs have short black bristles and rough surfaces. Their merus has a grainy texture on its upper and outer surface. Opposed to their carpus, which has a smooth texture, with only their inner side possessing a grainy texture.

=== Studies ===
Henshaw’s Shore Crabs were part of a case study that measured Na⁺/K⁺-ATPas gill activity in five crab species exposed to different seawater concentrations. The highest enzyme activity occurred in the Metopograpsus thukuhar and Cyclograpsus henshawi specimens. When placed in 50% seawater, it showed no change. The results suggest that gill Na⁺/K⁺-ATPase plays a key role in helping crabs both absorb salts in dilute conditions and release them in concentrated environments.

== Distribution and habitat ==
The Henshaw’s Shore Crab is endemic to Hawai’i and can be found on the islands of Oahu, Maui, and the Big Island. It resides in the intertidal zone under stones along the water's edge of sheltered bays and along the breakwater.

The initial specimens were collected by H.W. Henshaw from Hilo, R.C. McGregor from Kahului, and the Copenhagen Museum from the Galathea Expedition.
