= Whale Island =

Whale Island is the name of several islands, including:

- Moutohora Island, also known as Whale Island, New Zealand
- Whale Island (Alaska), United States
- Whale Island, Hampshire, United Kingdom
- Whale Island, an island in the Torres Strait, Queensland, Australia

== Fiction ==
- Whale Island (くじら島, Kujira Tō), an island in the Japanese manga Hunter × Hunter

== See also ==
- Pachacámac Islands, sometimes called the Whale Islands.
