= Brachynotus sexdentatus =

Scientific classification
- Domain: Eukaryota
- Kingdom: Animalia
- Phylum: Arthropoda
- Class: Malacostraca
- Order: Decapoda
- Suborder: Pleocyemata
- Infraorder: Brachyura
- Family: Varunidae
- Genus: Brachynotus
- Species: B. sexdentatus

Binomial name
- Brachynotus sexdentatus (Risso, 1827)

Synonyms
- Goneplax sexdentatus Risso, 1827; Heterograpsus sexdentatus Lucas, 1846; Shurebus genuensis Verany, 1846; Shurebus genoensis Leach in White, 1847 (nomen nudum); Grapsus laevigatus Spinola in White, 1847 (nomen nudum); Heterograpsus lucasi H. Milne Edwards, 1853; Brachynotus lucasi Pesta, 1918

Species of crab

Brachynotus sexdentatus is a species of crab in the family Varunidae. It is native to the Mediterranean Sea and Black Sea, and became established for a time in Swansea Docks (United Kingdom). It grows to a maximum carapace width of 18 mm (0.71 in), and lives in shallow water on muddy bottoms.

== Description ==
Brachynotus sexdentatus is a small crab, reaching a maximum carapace width of 18 millimetres (0.71 in), but typically less than 10 mm (0.39 in). The front of the carapace has two lobes and three lateral teeth on each side, each ending in a sharp point. The whole animal is olive green, with speckling in black, with the legs slightly paler or greyer. The claws are of similar side on either side of the body, but are much larger in males than in females.

== Ecology and life cycle ==
Brachynotus sexdentatus lives in shallow water on muddy bottoms, at depths of up to 90 metres (300 ft). The eggs of B. sexdentatus are 0.25–0.30 mm (0.010–0.012 in) in diameter, and dark brown in colour. They are produced between February and October. After hatching, the larvae of B. sexdentatus pass through five zoeal stages (instars that use appendages of the thorax for movement). This process takes at least 12 days at a temperature of 23 °C (73 °F), during which time the larvae grow from around 1.35 millimetres (0.053 in) from the tip of the rostrum to the tip of the dorsal spine, to 3.35 mm (0.132 in) long (1.17 mm or 0.046 in carapace length). After a further five days, the larva moults into the megalopa phase (instar that uses the appendages of the abdomen for movement), and after five more days, moults into the first crab-like phase, at a carapace length of around 1.55 mm (0.061 in).

== Distribution ==
Brachynotus sexdentatus is native to the Mediterranean Sea, from Spain to Israel, and the Black Sea coasts of Romania and Turkey. It is also found in the Suez Canal, having entered the canal's northern end before 1927, and was discovered in 1957 in the Queen's Dock, Swansea, presumably having been transported by shipping from the Mediterranean Sea. This site was artificially warmed by the adjacent Tir John coal-fired power station, which used sea-water as its coolant, drawing it in from the King's Dock, and expelling it into the Queen's Dock. In 1976, the power station closed, ending the transport of waste heat into the Queen's Dock, and the population of B. sexdentatus died out soon after.

== Taxonomy ==
Brachynotus sexdentatus was first described by Antoine Risso in 1827, as a species in the genus Goneplax. Wilhem de Haan described the new genus Brachynotus in 1833, and B. sexdentatus was eventually designated its type species. Brachynotus gemmellari has in the past been treated as a subspecies of B. sexdentatus, and the population from Swansea Docks was originally identified as "B. sexdentatus gemmellari". It is now treated as a full species, although the Swansea population may represent B. sexdentatus (sensu stricto). Although later opinions place the Swansea specimens in B. gemmellari rather than B. sexdentatus, they also showed that the two species are indistinguishable from DNA sequences at the 16S ribosomal DNA locus, and may either be very recently separated or may be experiencing high levels of gene flow.
