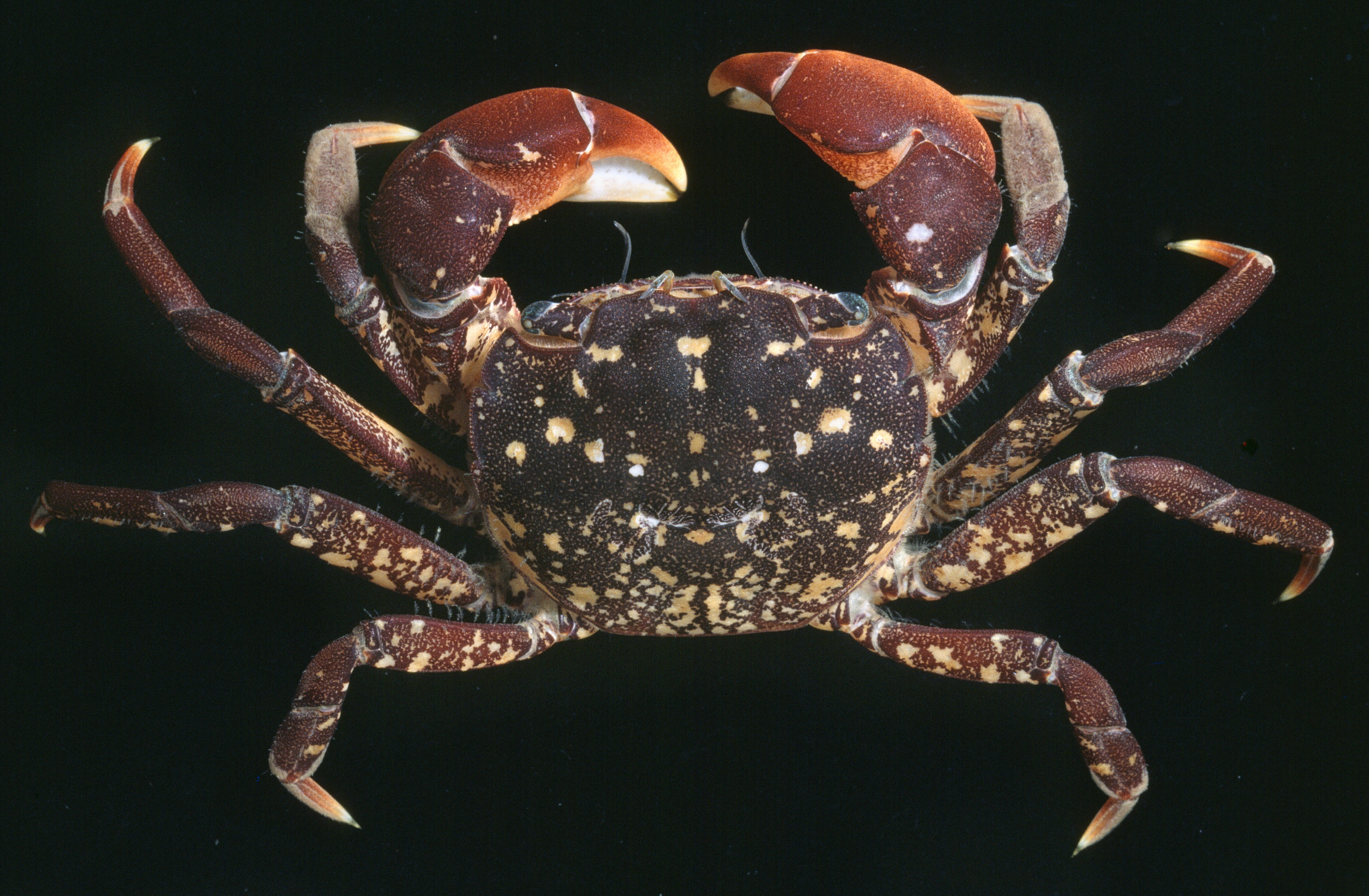
- Paragrapsus laevis

Scientific classification
- Kingdom: Animalia
- Phylum: Arthropoda
- Class: Malacostraca
- Order: Decapoda
- Suborder: Pleocyemata
- Infraorder: Brachyura
- Family: Varunidae
- Genus: Paragrapsus; H. Milne-Edwards, 1837

Type species
- Paragrapsus quadridentatus H. Milne-Edwards, 1837

= Paragrapsus =

Genus of crabs

Paragrapsus is a genus of crabs from South Eastern Australia, containing the following species:

- Paragrapsus gaimardii (H. Milne-Edwards, 1837)
- Paragrapsus laevis (Dana, 1851)
- Paragrapsus quadridentatus (H. Milne-Edwards, 1837)
- Paragrapsus urvillei H. Milne-Edwards, 1853 was later referred to as part of the genus Helice by Tesch in 1918, but is listed as the accepted name by others.
