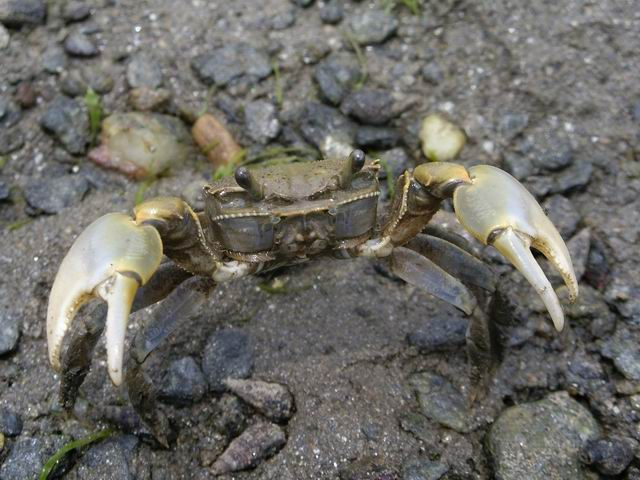

Scientific classification
- Domain: Eukaryota
- Kingdom: Animalia
- Phylum: Arthropoda
- Class: Malacostraca
- Order: Decapoda
- Suborder: Pleocyemata
- Infraorder: Brachyura
- Family: Varunidae
- Genus: Helice
- Species: H. tridens

Binomial name
- Helice tridens (De Haan, 1835)

Synonyms
- Ocypode tridens De Haan, 1835; Cyclograpsus latreillii H. Milne-Edwards, 1837; Helice latreillei H. Milne-Edwards, 1837

= Helice tridens =

Species of crab

Helice tridens is a species of crab which lives on mudflats around the coasts of Japan and the Korean Peninsula.

== Ecology ==
It is semi-terrestrial, returning to the sea to spawn. The species appears to be adversely affected by the presence of raccoons (Procyon lotor), an invasive predator. H. tridens has a salinity requirement which lies between those of two other estuarine crabs in Japan, Helicana japonica and Chiromantes dehaani.

Smaller individuals shelter in burrows in reed marshes, apparently in order to avoid cannibalism; this may also be the reason for the migration of larger individuals to brackish water lagoons in summer, when the crabs exceed their carrying capacity.

== Taxonomy ==
Helice tridens was first described by Wilhem de Haan in an 1835 volume of Fauna Japonica, as Ocypode tridens. The former subspecies H. t. wuana and H. t. sheni are now recognised as a separate species, Helicana wuana.
