= Helice =

Helice may refer to:

- Helice shooting, a kind of clay pigeon shooting
- Helice (mythology), the name of several figures in Greek mythology
- Helike, an ancient Greek city
- Helice (crab), crab genus

== See also ==
- Helices, the plural of helix
