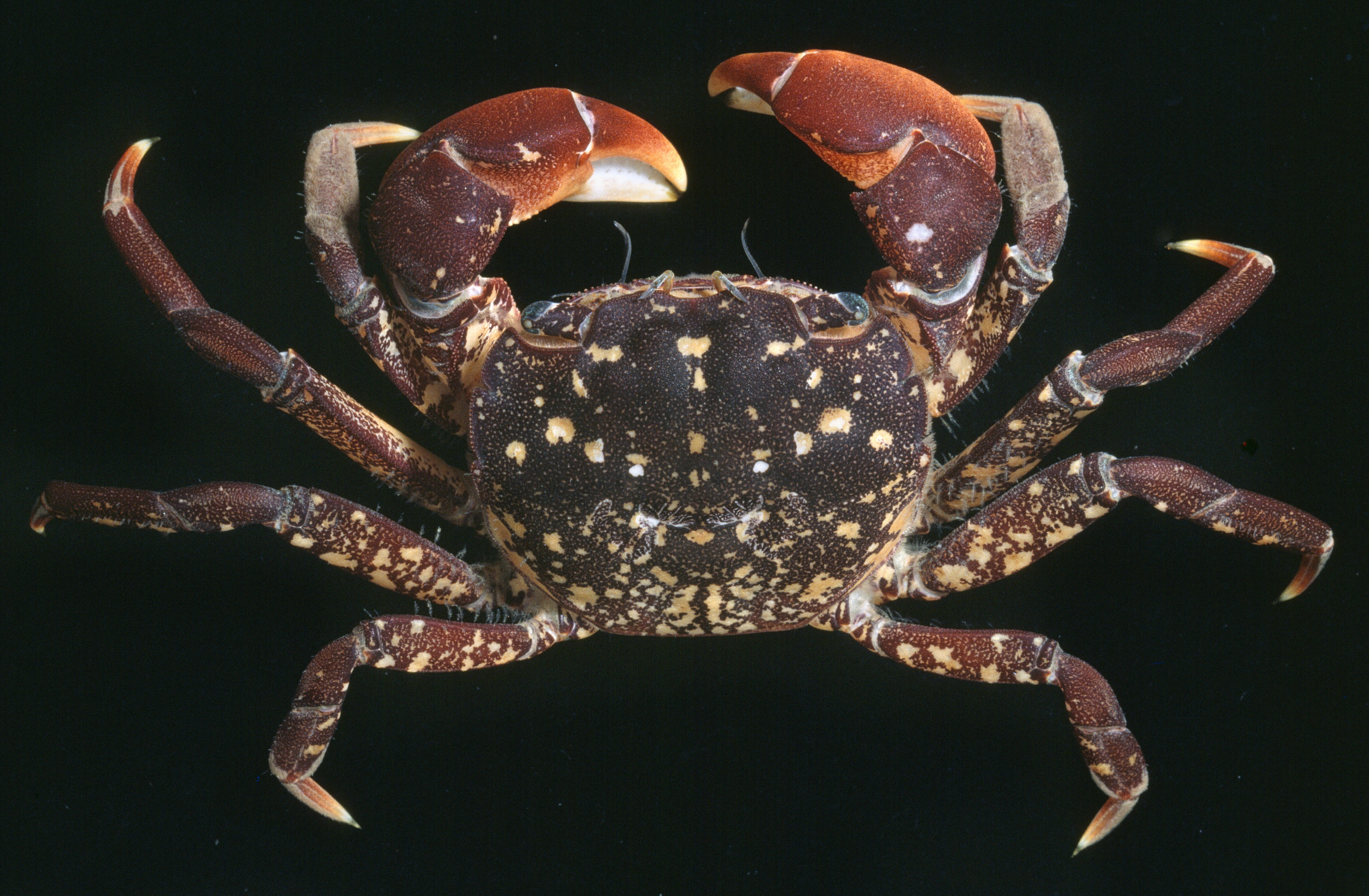

Scientific classification
- Kingdom: Animalia
- Phylum: Arthropoda
- Class: Malacostraca
- Order: Decapoda
- Suborder: Pleocyemata
- Infraorder: Brachyura
- Family: Varunidae
- Genus: Paragrapsus
- Species: P. laevis

Binomial name
- Paragrapsus laevis (Dana, 1851)

= Paragrapsus laevis =

Species of crab

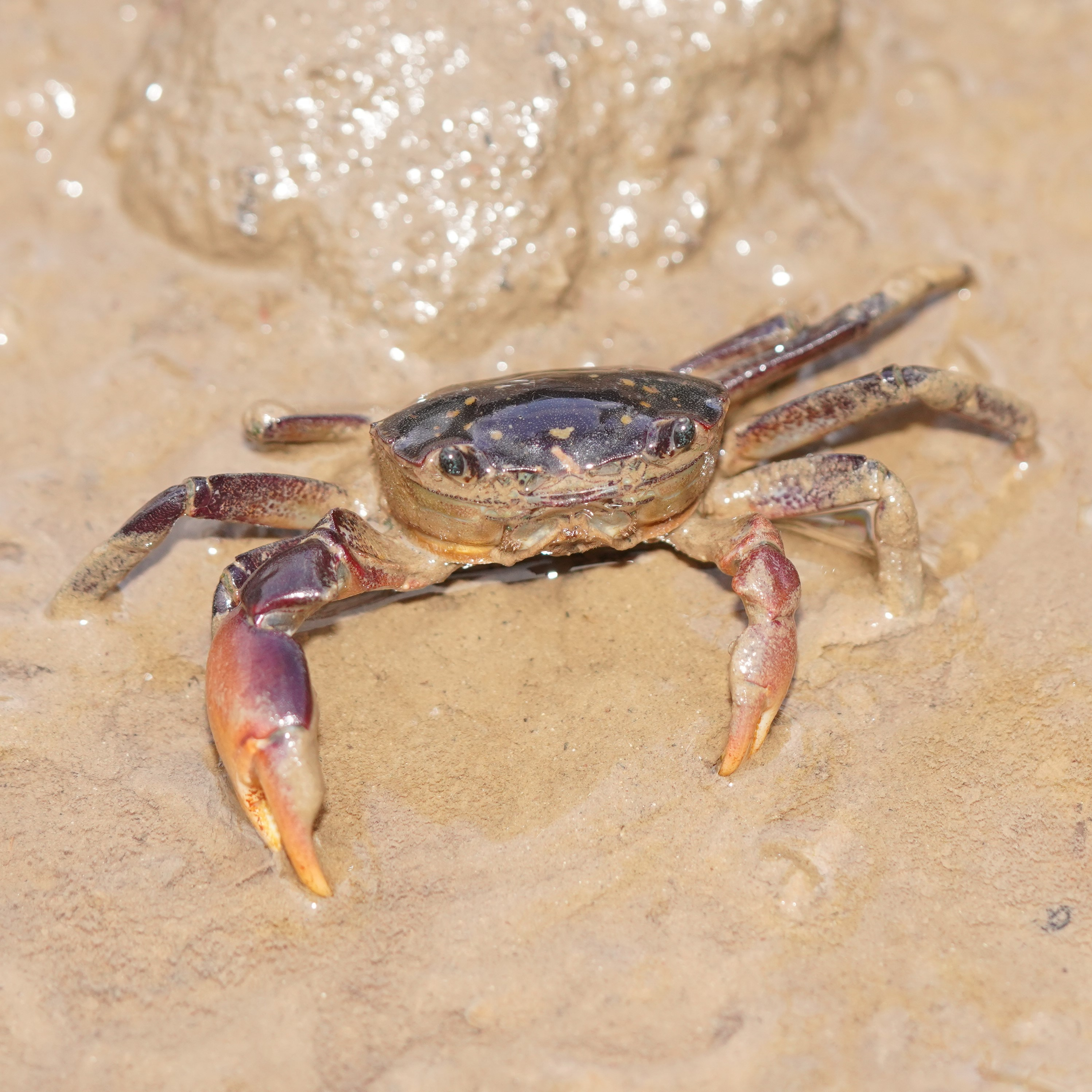
Paragrapsus laevis

Paragrapsus laevis is a species of crab found in south eastern Australia, from southern Queensland to around the South Australian border, including Tasmania.

It is commonly known as the mottled shore crab. Carapace is up to around 35 to 40mm across, with two notches in each side behind the eye, and has two well defined lobes. Claws are reddish on top, whitish underneath. Paragrapsus laevis individuals are redder and a little smaller than Paragrapsus gaimardii individuals. Males have significantly large claws compared to females.

It lives on tidal shores, in sheltered bays or in estuaries, but not far inland. It can be found in mangroves in burrows and under debris or rocks.

Chasmagnathus laevis, Paragrapsus verreauxi are previous synonyms of Paragrapsus laevis.
