= Omega (barque) =

Ship

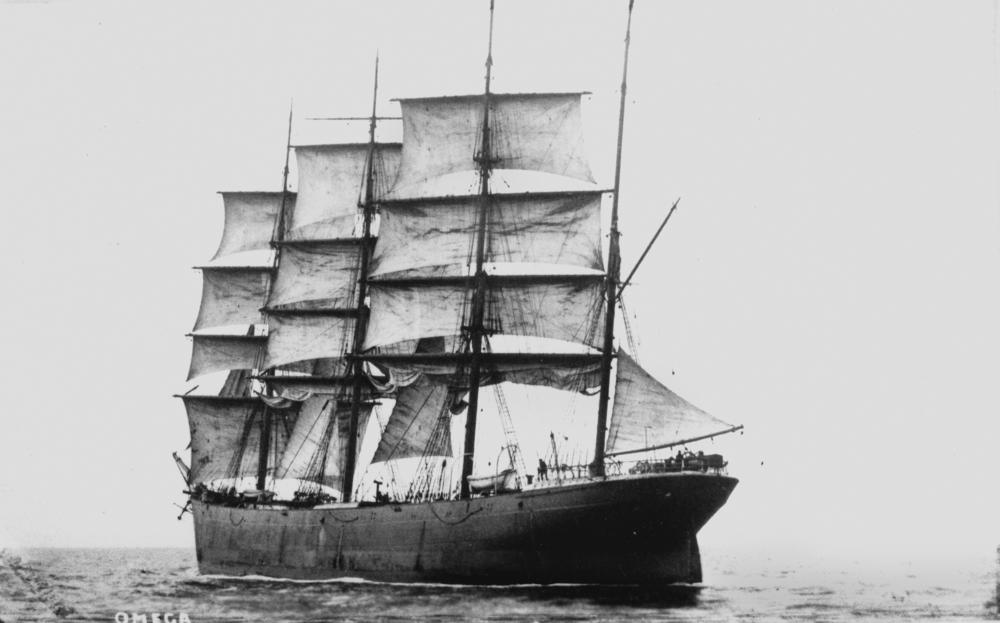
- Omega

History
- Name: Drumcliff (1887–98); Omega (1898–1958)
- Owner: Gillison & Chadwick (1887–98); Hamburger Rhederei AG (1898–1920); Peruvian Government (1920–26); Compania Adminstradora del Guano (1926–58)
- Port of registry: (United Kingdom of Great Britain and Ireland) Liverpool (1887–98); (Germany) Hamburg (1898–1920); (Peru) Callao (1920–58)
- Builder: J. Russell & Co, Greenock
- Launched: 1887
- Out of service: 26 June 1958
- Identification: United Kingdom Official Number 93713 (1887–98); Code Letters KJVQ (1887–98); Code Letters RLBQ (1898–1920)
- Fate: Sank 1958

General characteristics
- Tonnage: 2,471 GRT; 2,468 NRT; 2,378 tons under deck
- Length: 94.68 m (310 ft 8 in)
- Beam: 13.16 m (43 ft 2 in)
- Propulsion: Sails
- Sail plan: Barque

The Omega (named Drumcliff until 1898) was a four-masted, steel-hulled barque built in Greenock, Scotland in 1887. In 1957, the Omega became the last working cargo-carrying square-rigger afloat. She carried oil, guano, nitrate, wheat, and other goods. She sank in 1958, ending that age of sail.

== History ==
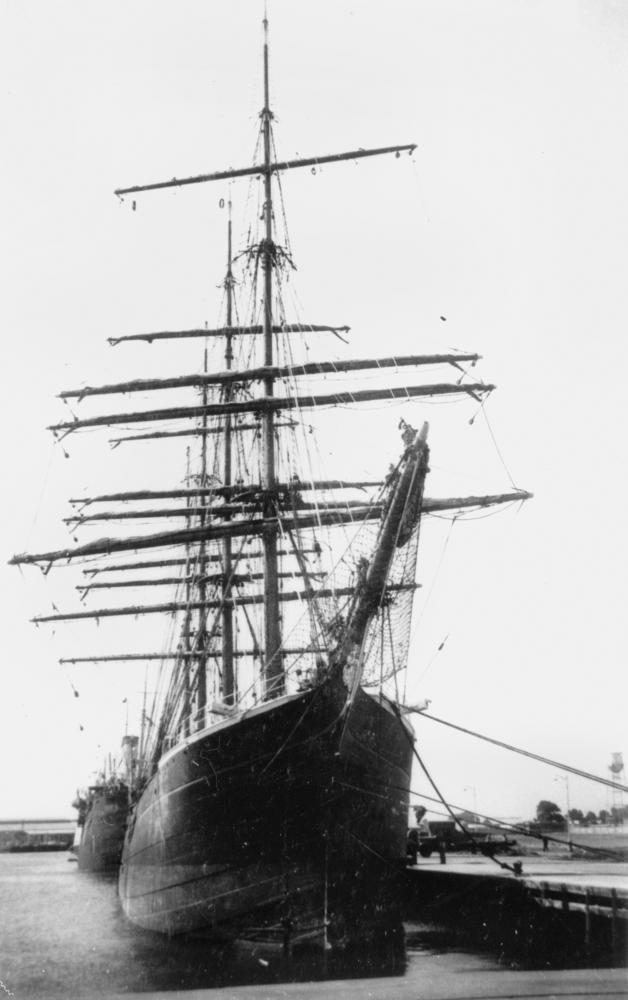
The Omega by the bows

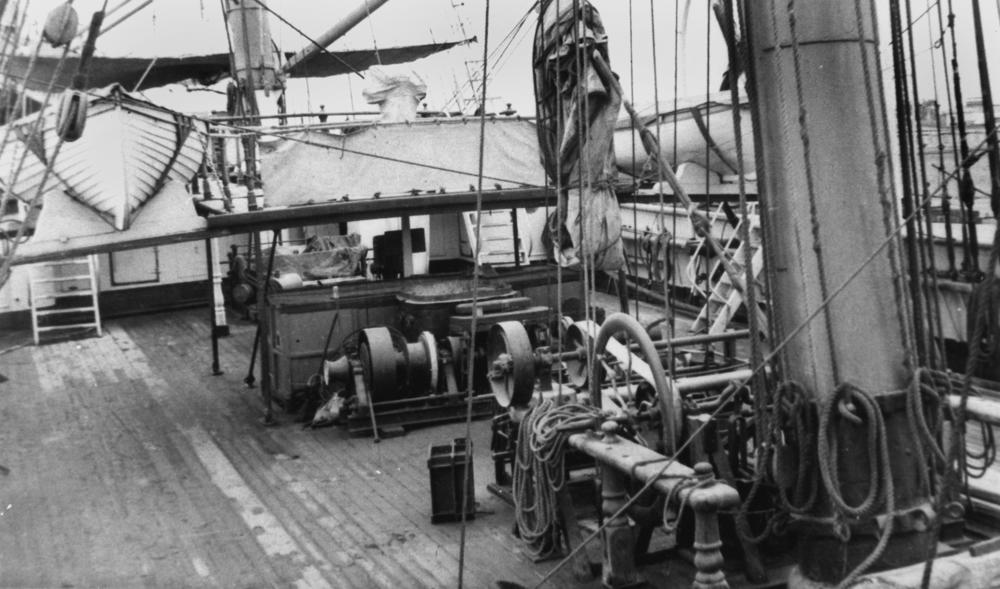
Deck of the Omega

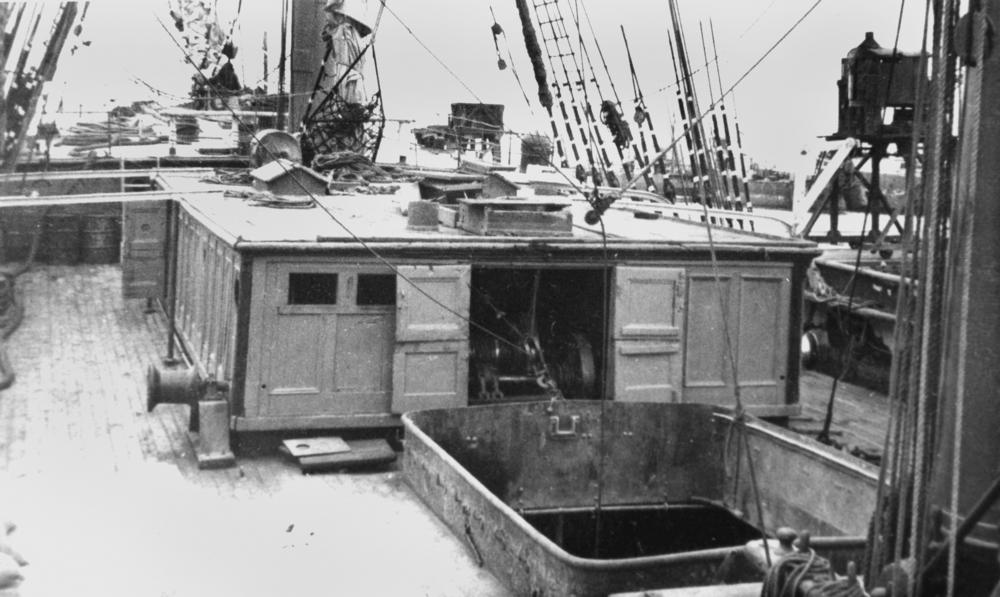
Deck hatch of the Omega, the last square-rigged sailing cargo ship

The Drumcliff was built at the shipyard of J. Russell & Co. in Greenock, Scotland, for Gillison & Chadwick, Liverpool, England. After her launching in 1887, she was placed under the command of Captain H. Davies. On 28 July 1898, the Drumcliff was sold to the Hamburger Reederei AG, which renamed her Omega. From 1898 until 1905 she sailed under Captain H. Krause, who was in command for her first great trip around the world. In 1898 she left the Lizard in the south of England for Adelaide, Australia. The following year she sailed to Newcastle, Australia, putting in at the Chilean harbours of Tocopilla and Iquique, before returning to the Lizard.

From 1906 until 1907 she sailed under Captain M. Ratzsch, followed by Captain A. Schellhas from 1908 until 1920. Under his command the ship also made long passages between Europe, South America (Pisagua and Tocopilla in Chile), Africa (Port Nolloth in South Africa) and Australia (Newcastle). From 1910 until 1912, under Captain G. Oellrich, she sailed to harbours on the West Coast of the US (San Diego, Portland, Oregon), in Europe (Hamburg, Rotterdam), Australia (Sydney, Newcastle), and South America (Chile). From 1913 until 1914 Captain P. Hammer assumed command.

During the First World War, the ship was interned in Peru. In 1918, she became a sail training ship.

In 1920, the Omega was released to Peru as a war reparation, and in 1926 she was transferred to the guano firm Compañia Administradora del Guano in Callao, Peru. From then on, the ship was used to transport guano from outlying islands to the Peruvian mainland.

Over the course of the following decades, as all the large sailing ships were gradually removed from service, in the wake of the sinking of Pamir and the end of service of Passat, the Omega remained.

"The only commercial square-rigged sailing ships still operating anywhere in the world, in the year 1953, were the Peruvian guano barques: the three-masters Tellus and Maipo, and the four-master Omega."

In 1957 the Omega became the last vessel of that category. On 26 June 1958 she embarked on a voyage from the Pachacámac Islands to Huacho, both in the Lima region along the Peruvian coast, with a load of 3,000 tons of guano. She sprang a leak and sank, ending her era of sail. Her captain, Juan Anibal Escobar Hurtado from Callao, was charged with sinking the ship and had his license suspended. In spite of paying divers to photograph the wreck to show that the Omega sank due to age and poor maintenance, he was never cleared and died six years after the sinking, on 16 August 1964.

== Bibliography ==
- Bruzelius, Lars (23 January 1999). "Sailing Ships: Drumcliff". The Maritime History Virtual Archives. According to Bruzelius, there are discrepancies regarding the measurements of Drumcliff/Omega. 94.86 m × 13.15 m × 7.36 m (311'3 × 43'2 × 24'2 in feet), with another source indicating 90.96 m × 13.16 m ×7.47 m.
- Ageofsail.net, Nov. 15, 2006
