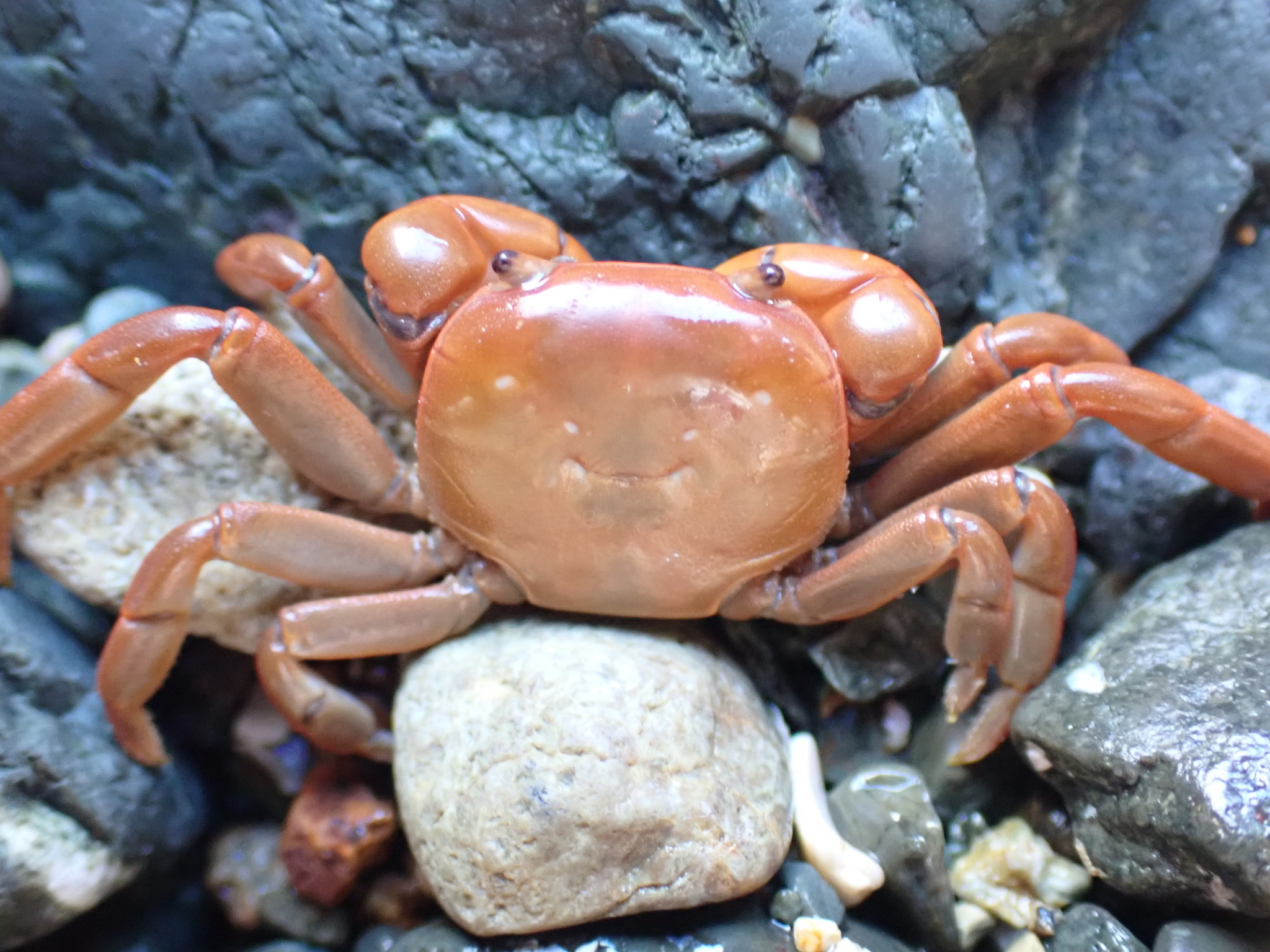

Scientific classification
- Kingdom: Animalia
- Phylum: Arthropoda
- Clade: Pancrustacea
- Class: Malacostraca
- Order: Decapoda
- Suborder: Pleocyemata
- Infraorder: Brachyura
- Family: Varunidae
- Genus: Cyclograpsus
- Species: C. insularum

Binomial name
- Cyclograpsus insularum Campbell & Griffin, 1966

= Northern smooth shore crab =

Species of crab

The northern smooth shore crab (Cyclograpsus insularum) is a marine crab of the family Varunidae, found around Lord Howe Island, Norfolk Island, the Kermadec Islands and in New Zealand from North Cape to East Cape. Their carapace width is up to 22 millimetres (0.87 in).
