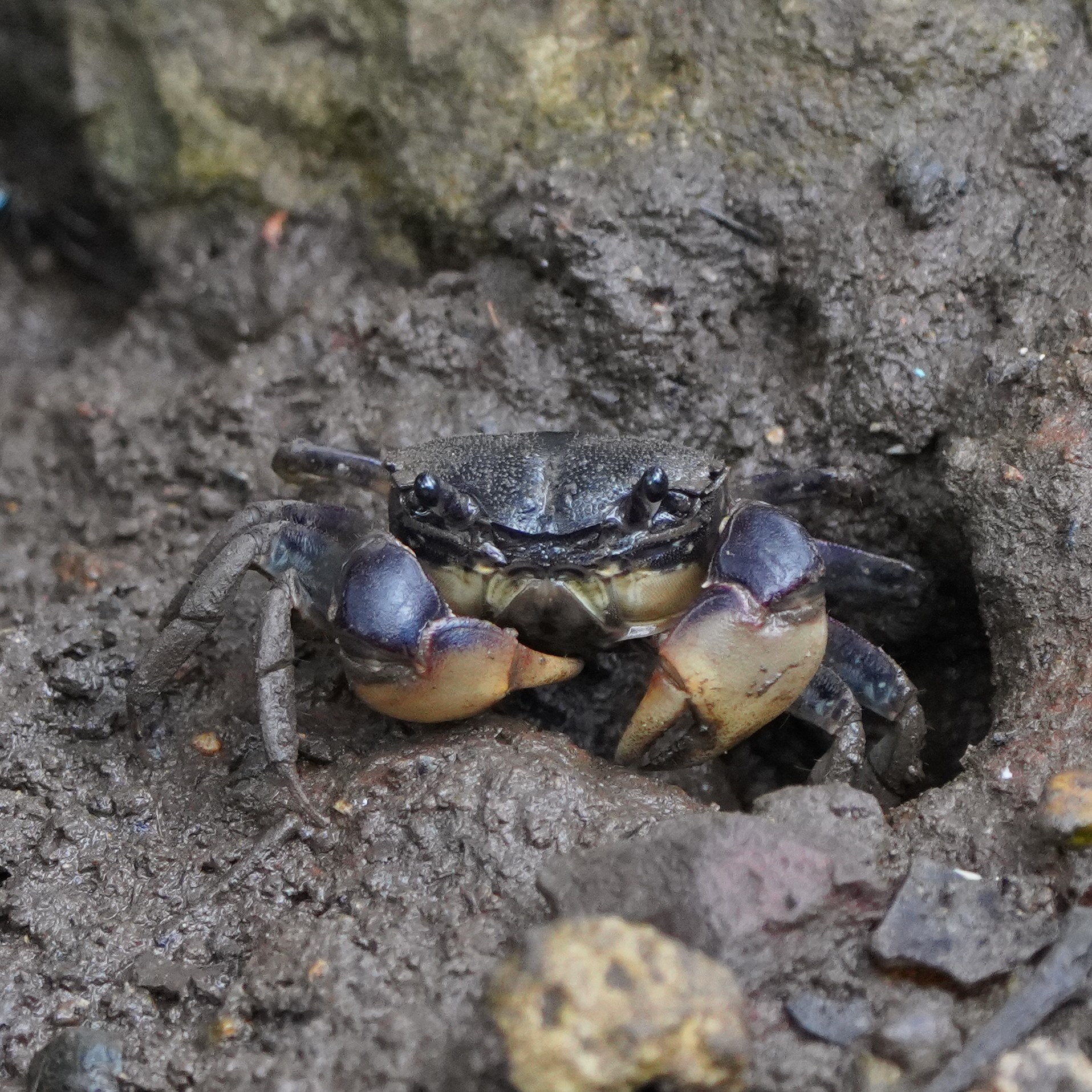

Scientific classification
- Domain: Eukaryota
- Kingdom: Animalia
- Phylum: Arthropoda
- Class: Malacostraca
- Order: Decapoda
- Suborder: Pleocyemata
- Infraorder: Brachyura
- Family: Varunidae
- Genus: Pseudohelice
- Species: P. subquadrata

Binomial name
- Pseudohelice subquadrata (Dana, 1851)

= Pseudohelice subquadrata =

Purple and cream shore crab

Species of crab

Pseudohelice subquadrata is a species of crab in the family Varunidae. It is found from the eastern Indian Ocean to the western Pacific Ocean, north to Japan, south to Eastern Australia, east to French Polynesia, west to Indonesia and Thailand. It lives near mangroves, burrowing in firm soils, firm muddy sand or loose stones. Burrows are towards or above the high tide line on shores of estuaries and near river mouths of bays, and can have offshoots horizontal beneath the surface as long as three metres.

The crab appears round in shape, with the carapace up to 25 mm (0.98 in) across. In Eastern Australia, the carapace is dark purplish with varying amounts of cream mottling towards the rear. The legs are purple with cream mottling. The claws also are purple and cream. However, color across the range may also be yellowish-brown, orange, olive or dark green, again with light mottling. There are two notches in each side of the carapace.

Common names in English include the purple and cream shore crab and the grey crab.

Synonyms of Pseudohelice subquadrata are Helice leachi and Chasmagnathus subquadrata.

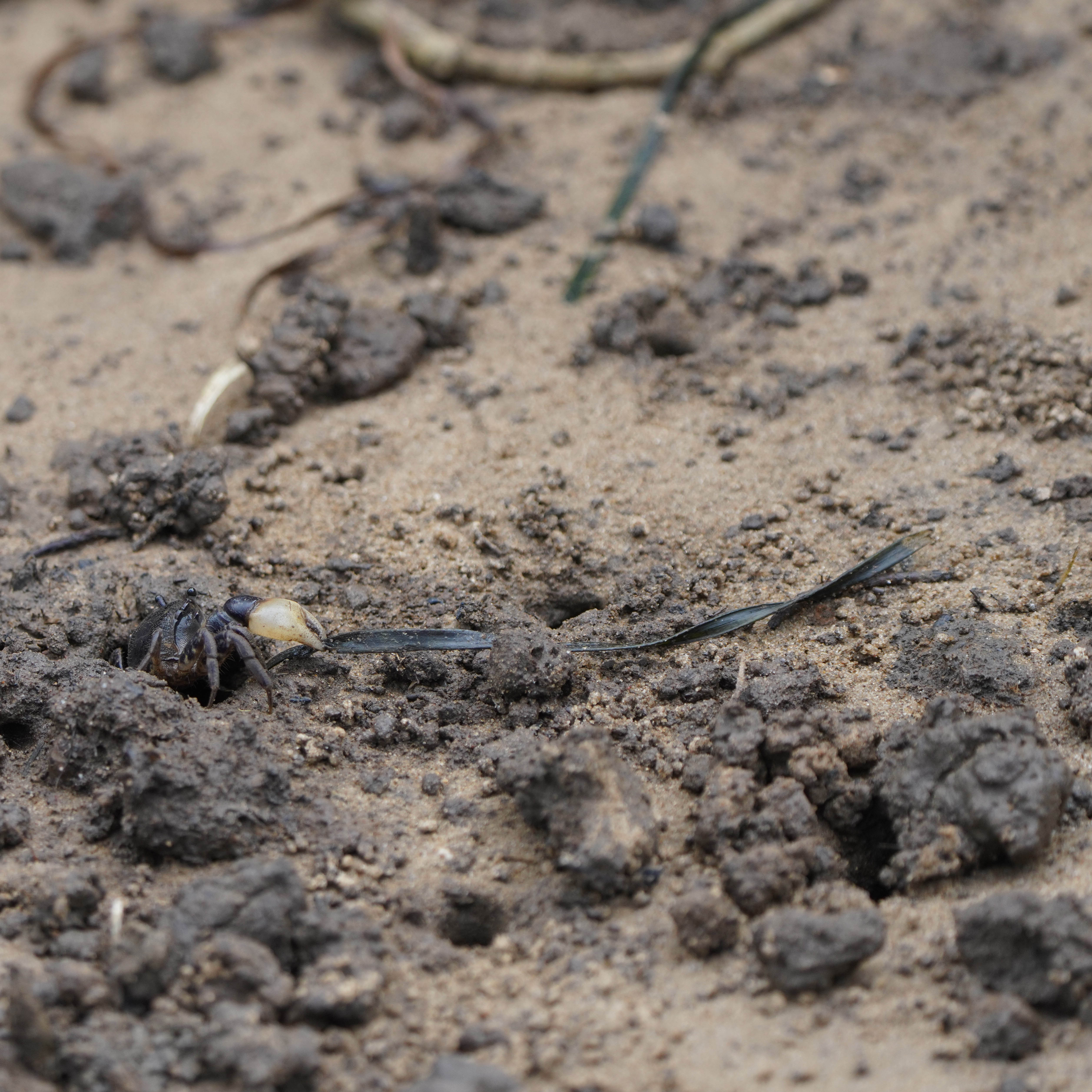
Pseudohelice subquadrata manoeuvring seagrass into burrow
