= Pseudograpsus setosus =

Scientific classification
- Kingdom: Animalia
- Phylum: Arthropoda
- Clade: Pancrustacea
- Class: Malacostraca
- Order: Decapoda
- Suborder: Pleocyemata
- Infraorder: Brachyura
- Family: Varunidae
- Genus: Pseudograpsus
- Species: P. setosus

Binomial name
- Pseudograpsus setosus (Fabricius, 1798)

Synonyms
- Alpheus setosus Weber, 1795; Cancer setosus Fabricius, 1798; Grapsus penicilliger Latreille, 1817; Pseudograpsus brabatus H. Milne-Edwards, 1853

Species of crab

Pseudograpsus setosus (Spanish: jaiba peluda) is a species of edible crab endemic to the coasts of Chile, Ecuador and Peru; it is a benthic predator that lives in the subtidal and intertidal zones in temperate waters from sea levels down to depths of 45 metres (150 ft). Its diet consists of clams, picorocos and other crabs. Its geographic distribution ranges from the equator in Ecuador to the Taitao Peninsula at 47° S. In Taiwan, it is known by the nickname "Hau Pei-tsun crab" in the public.
