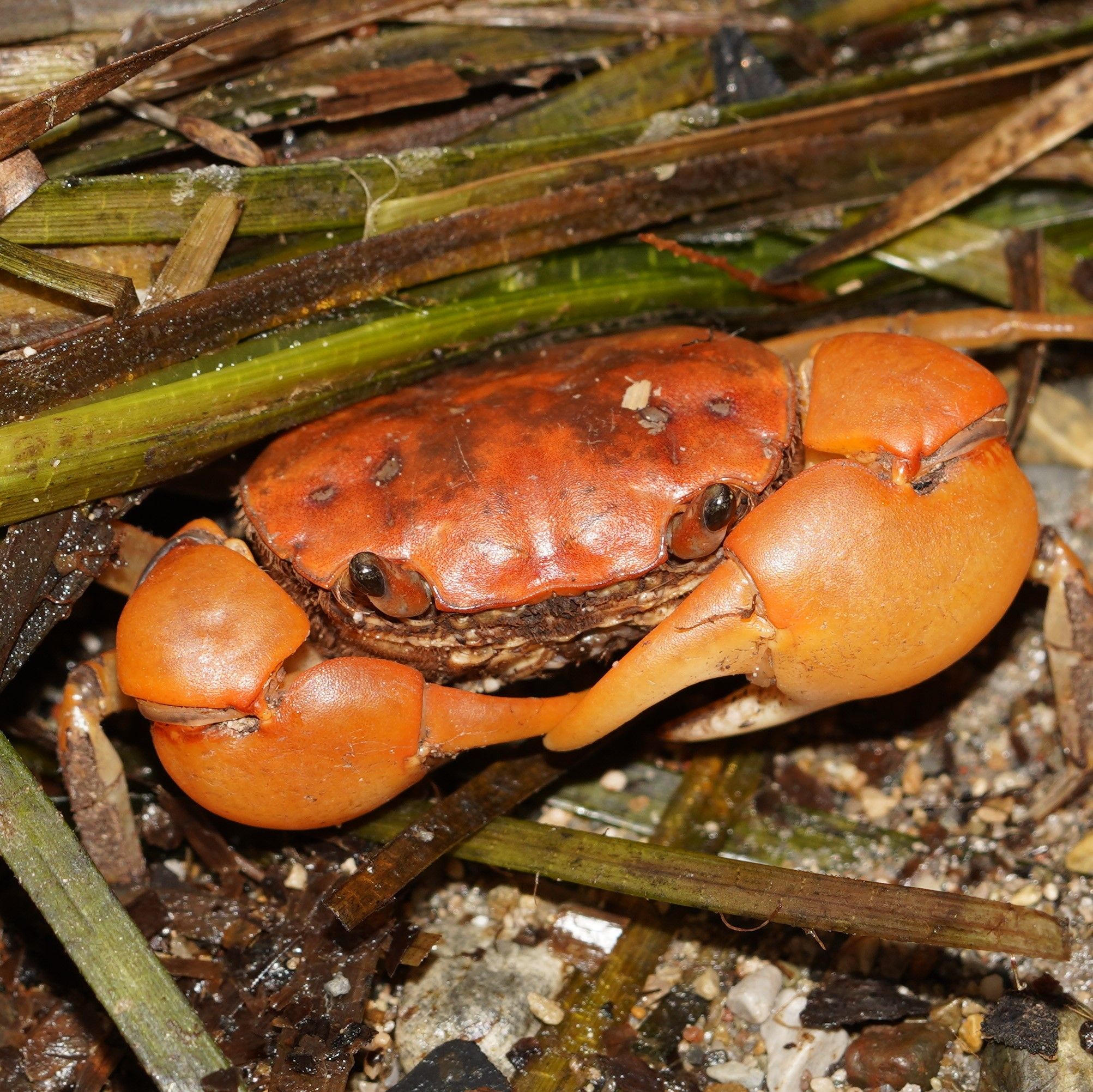

Scientific classification
- Kingdom: Animalia
- Phylum: Arthropoda
- Clade: Pancrustacea
- Class: Malacostraca
- Order: Decapoda
- Suborder: Pleocyemata
- Infraorder: Brachyura
- Family: Varunidae
- Subfamily: Cyclograpsinae
- Genus: Helograpsus; Campbell & Griffin, 1966
- Species: H. haswellianus

Binomial name
- Helograpsus haswellianus (Whitelegge, 1889)

Synonyms
- Chasmagnathus convexus Haswell, 1881; Chasmagnathus Haswellianus Whitelegge, 1890

= Helograpsus =

Species of crab

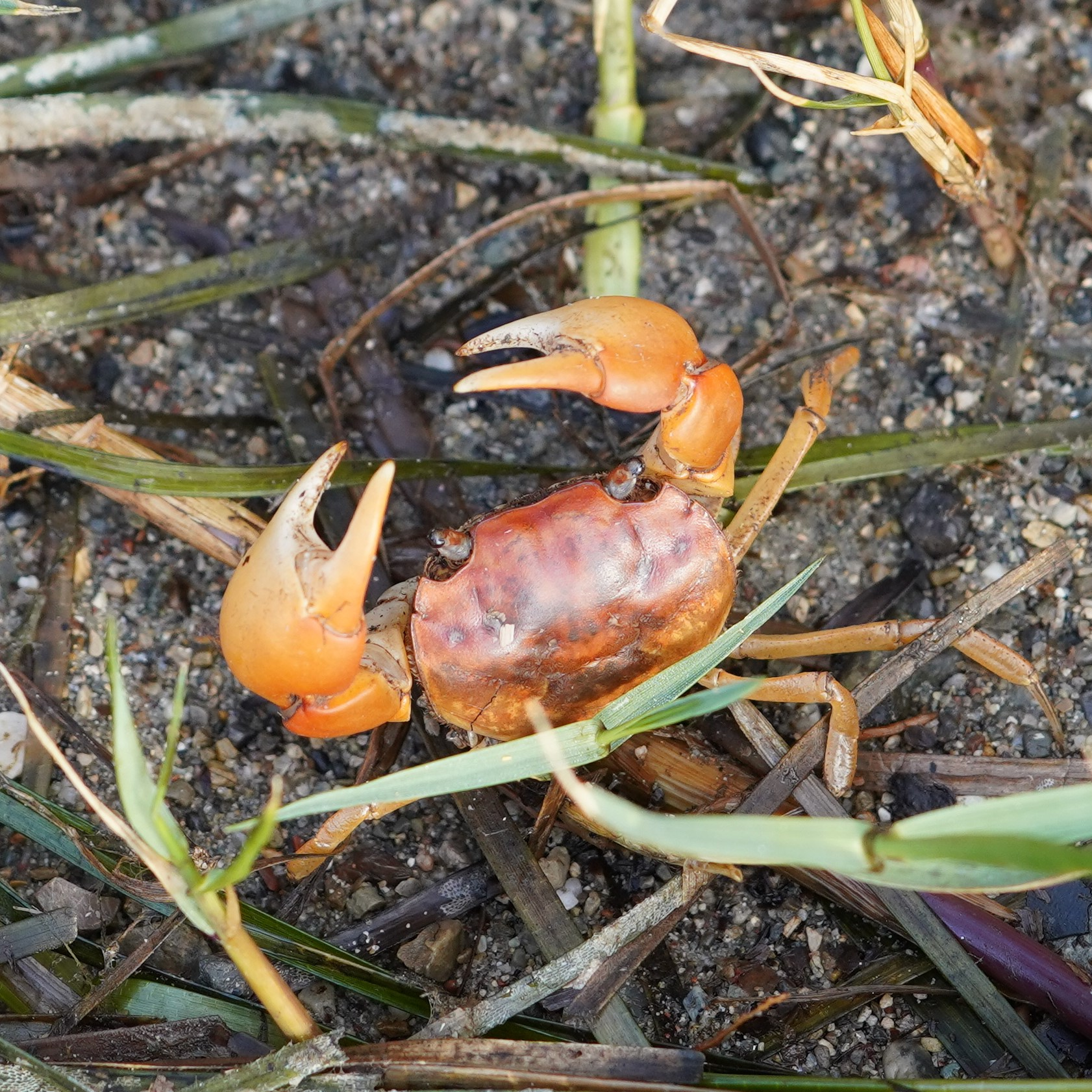
Helograpsus haswellianus

Helograpsus haswellianus, or Haswell’s shore crab, is the sole species of crab in the genus Helograpsus. It lives in river mouths and bays on the eastern coast of Australia (South Australia to Queensland, and Tasmania). The carapace is strongly convex with one distinct notch behind the eye. Adult males have larger claws than adult females. The carapace is olive, dark slate grey or reddish. Claws of adult males are orange-yellow. Carapace size is up to 30 mm wide. The orange color is stronger when these crabs live in habitat with lower pollution levels.

Helograpsus haswellianus lives in tidal saltmarshes, and can be active at night. It constructs burrows 30–40 cm deep above the high tide level, living at the highest shore levels of marine crabs. The burrows can be in dirty sand or mud. It can also be found under rocks. Crabs range up to 20 m from their burrows. Their burrows increase the surface area of shore sediments exposed to saltwater and help maintain the condition of tidal marshes.

Chasmagnathus convexus and Chasmagnathus haswellianus are synonyms of Helograpsus haswellianus.
