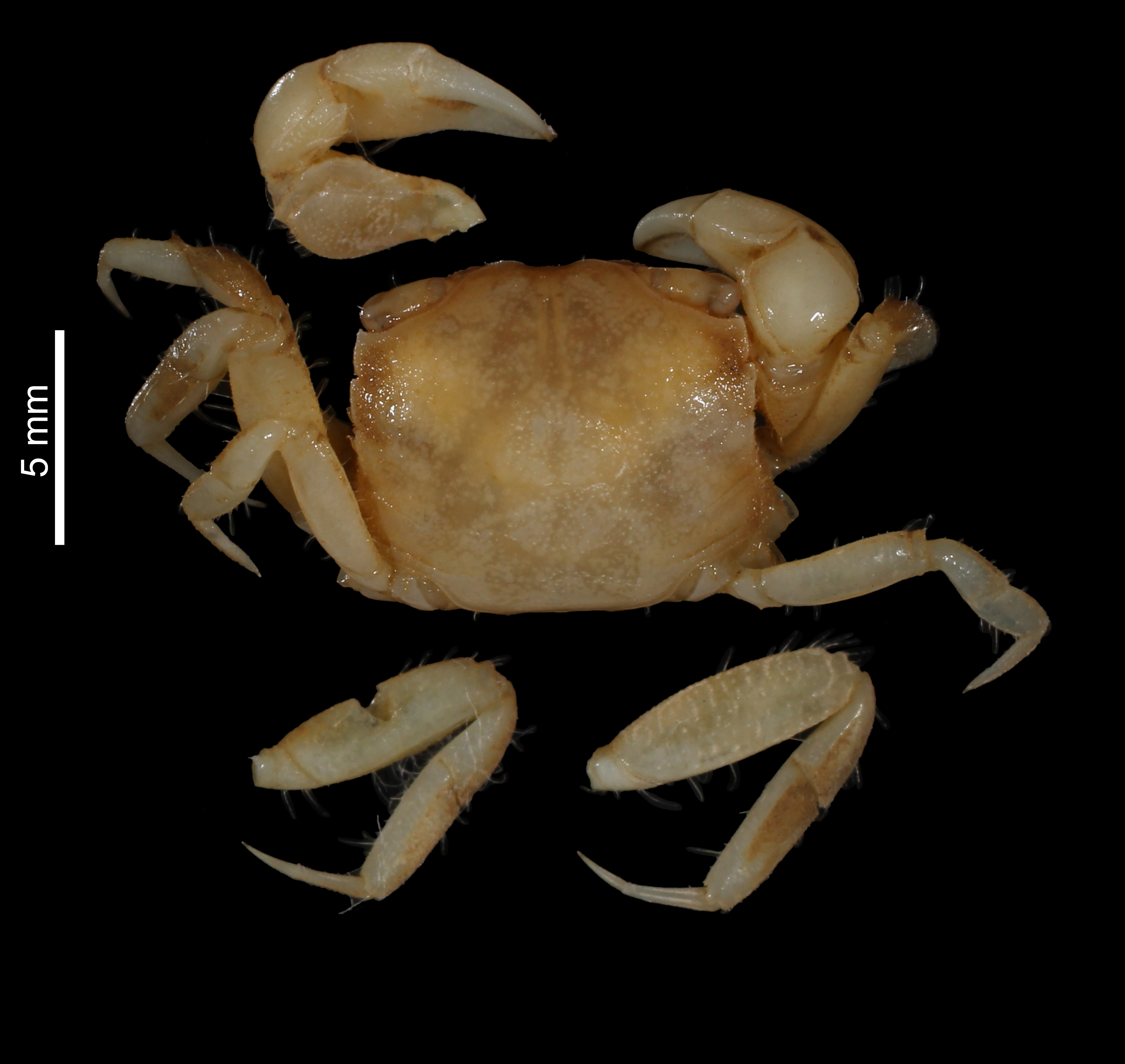
- Parahelice balssi

Scientific classification
- Kingdom: Animalia
- Phylum: Arthropoda
- Class: Malacostraca
- Order: Decapoda
- Suborder: Pleocyemata
- Infraorder: Brachyura
- Family: Varunidae
- Subfamily: Cyclograpsinae
- Genus: Parahelice; Sakai, Türkay & Yang, 2006

= Parahelice =

Genus of crabs

Parahelice is a genus of crabs, containing five species:

The species reported in Parahelice genus are:

- Parahelice balssi (Sakai, Türkay & Yang, 2006)
- Parahelice daviei (Sakai, Türkay & Yang, 2006)
- Parahelice georgei (Clark, 1987)
- Parahelice pilimana (A. Milne-Edwards, 1873)
- Parahelice pilosa (Sakai, Türkay & Yang, 2006)
