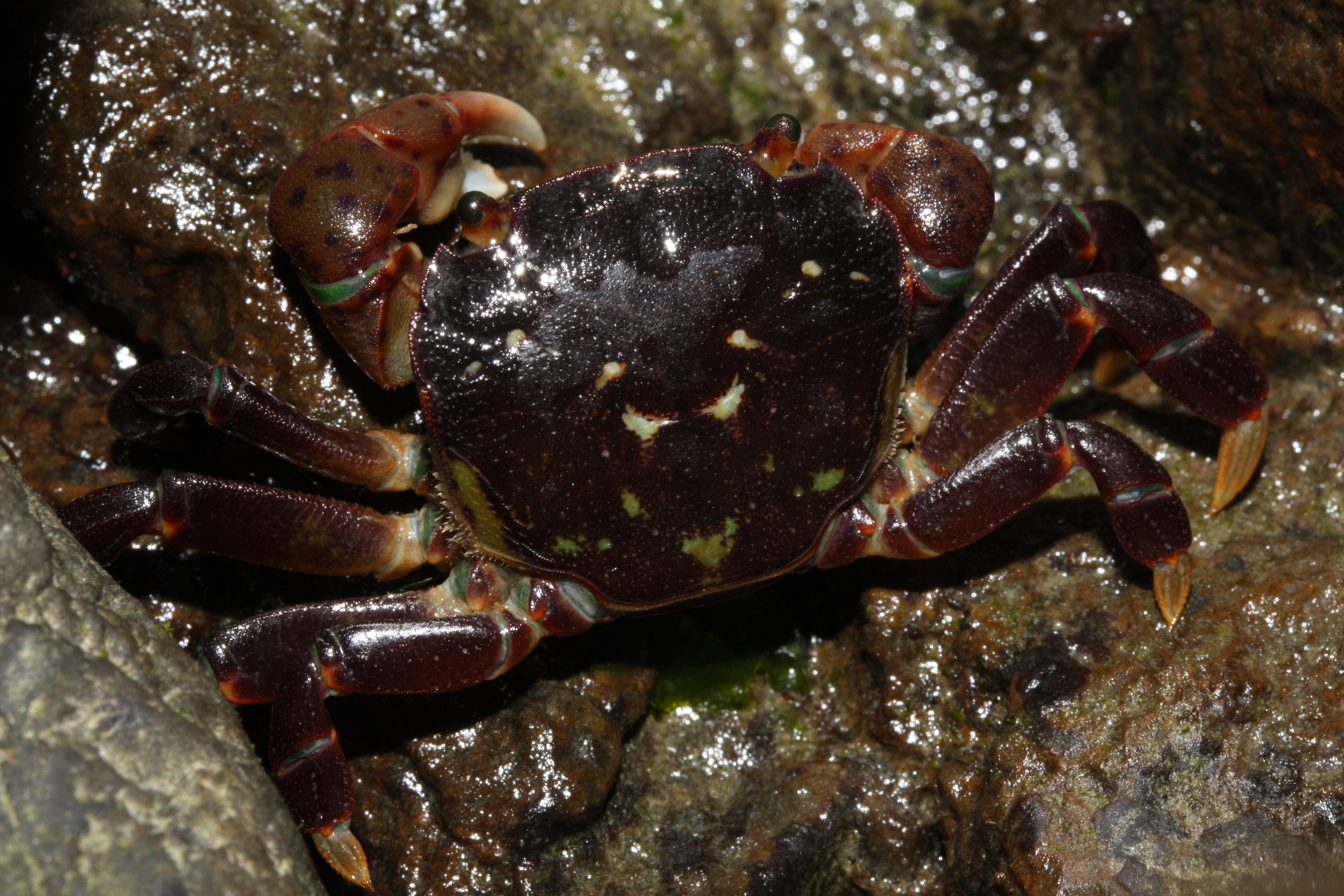
- Purple shore crab (Hemigrapsus nudus: Varunidae)

Scientific classification
- Kingdom: Animalia
- Phylum: Arthropoda
- Class: Malacostraca
- Order: Decapoda
- Suborder: Pleocyemata
- Clade: Reptantia
- Infraorder: Brachyura
- Section: Eubrachyura
- Subsection: Thoracotremata
- Superfamily: Grapsoidea; Macleay, 1838

Families
- Gecarcinidae; Glyptograpsidae; Grapsidae; Percnidae; Plagusiidae; Sesarmidae; Varunidae; Xenograpsidae

Synonyms
- See text

= Grapsoidea =

Superfamily of crabs

The Grapsoidea are a superfamily of crabs; they are well known and contain many taxa which are terrestrial (land-living), semiterrestrial (taking to the sea only for reproduction), or limnic (living in fresh water). Another well-known member with a more conventional lifestyle is the Chinese mitten crab, Eriocheir sinensis.

The delimitation of the Grapsidae and Plagusiidae is in need of revision; the latter at least is not monophyletic. The same apparently holds true for several genera in the Sesarmidae.

The closest living relatives of the Grapsoidea are the Ocypodoidea. In fact, they seem to be paraphyletic with respect to each other and it seems warranted to merge the Ocypodoidea into the Grapsoidea.
