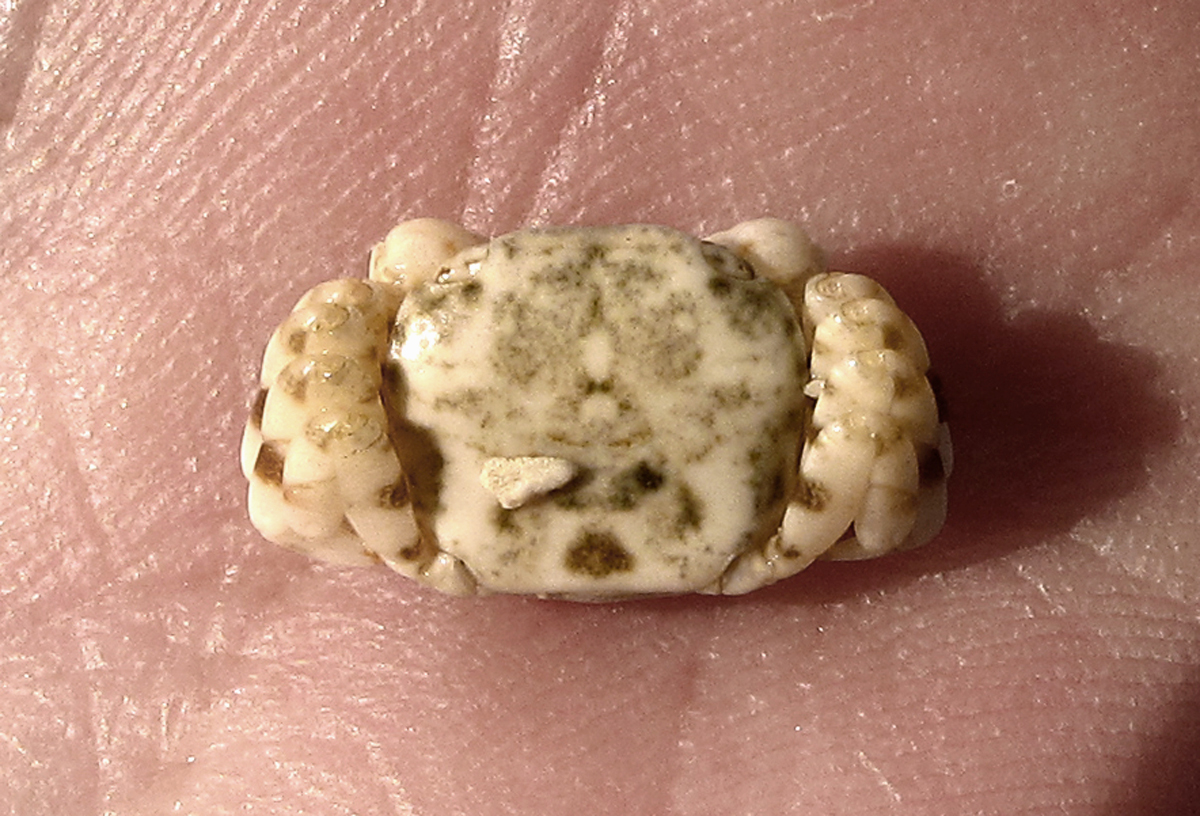
- Pseudograpsus albus in Réunion

Scientific classification
- Kingdom: Animalia
- Phylum: Arthropoda
- Class: Malacostraca
- Order: Decapoda
- Suborder: Pleocyemata
- Infraorder: Brachyura
- Family: Varunidae
- Subfamily: Varuninae
- Genus: Pseudograpsus; H. Milne-Edwards, 1837

= Pseudograpsus =

Genus of crabs

Pseudograpsus is a genus of crabs, containing the following species:

- Pseudograpsus albus Stimpson, 1858
- Pseudograpsus crassus A. Milne-Edwards, 1868
- Pseudograpsus elongatus (A. Milne-Edwards, 1873)
- Pseudograpsus intermedius Chhapgar, 1955
- Pseudograpsus nudus Stimpson, 1858
- Pseudograpsus setosus (Fabricius, 1798)
