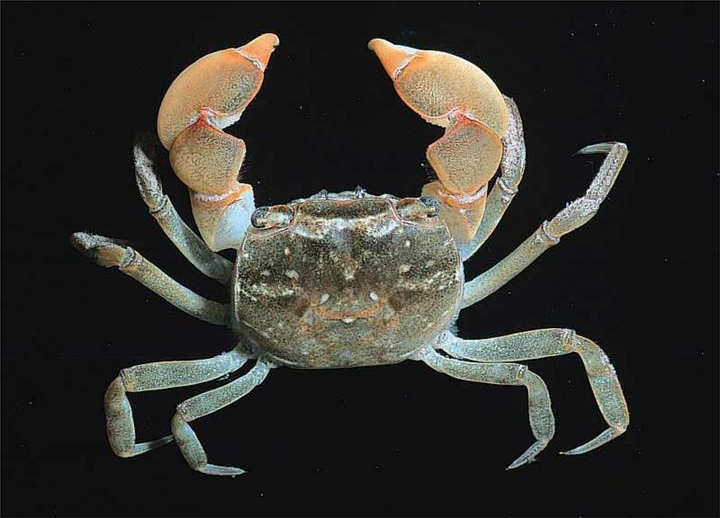
- Cyclograpsus granulosus

Scientific classification
- Kingdom: Animalia
- Phylum: Arthropoda
- Class: Malacostraca
- Order: Decapoda
- Suborder: Pleocyemata
- Infraorder: Brachyura
- Family: Varunidae
- Subfamily: Cyclograpsinae
- Genus: Cyclograpsus; H. Milne-Edwards, 1837

Type species
- Cyclograpsus punctatus H. Milne-Edwards, 1837

= Cyclograpsus =

Cyclograpsus Temporal range: Miocene–Recent

Genus of crabs

Cyclograpsus is a genus of crabs, containing the following species:

- Cyclograpsus audouinii H. Milne-Edwards, 1837
- Cyclograpsus barbatus (MacLeay, 1838)
- Cyclograpsus beccarii Nobili, 1899
- Cyclograpsus cinereus Dana, 1851
- Cyclograpsus escondidensis Rathbun, 1933
- Cyclograpsus eydouxi H. Milne-Edwards, 1853
- Cyclograpsus granulatus Dana, 1851
- Cyclograpsus granulosus H. Milne-Edwards, 1853
- Cyclograpsus henshawi Rathbun, 1902
- Cyclograpsus incisus Shen, 1940
- Cyclograpsus insularum Campbell & Griffin, 1966
- Cyclograpsus integer H. Milne-Edwards, 1837
- Cyclograpsus intermedius Ortmann, 1894
- Cyclograpsus lavauxi H. Milne-Edwards, 1853
- Cyclograpsus longipes Stimpson, 1858
- Cyclograpsus lucidus Dai, Yang, Song & Chen, 1986
- Cyclograpsus punctatus H. Milne-Edwards, 1837
- Cyclograpsus sanctaecrucis Griffin, 1968
- Cyclograpsus unidens Nobili, 1905

Around three further species are known only from fossils, dating from the Miocene:

- Cyclograpsus directus Karasawa, 1989
- Cyclograpsus rectangularis Karasawa, 1989
