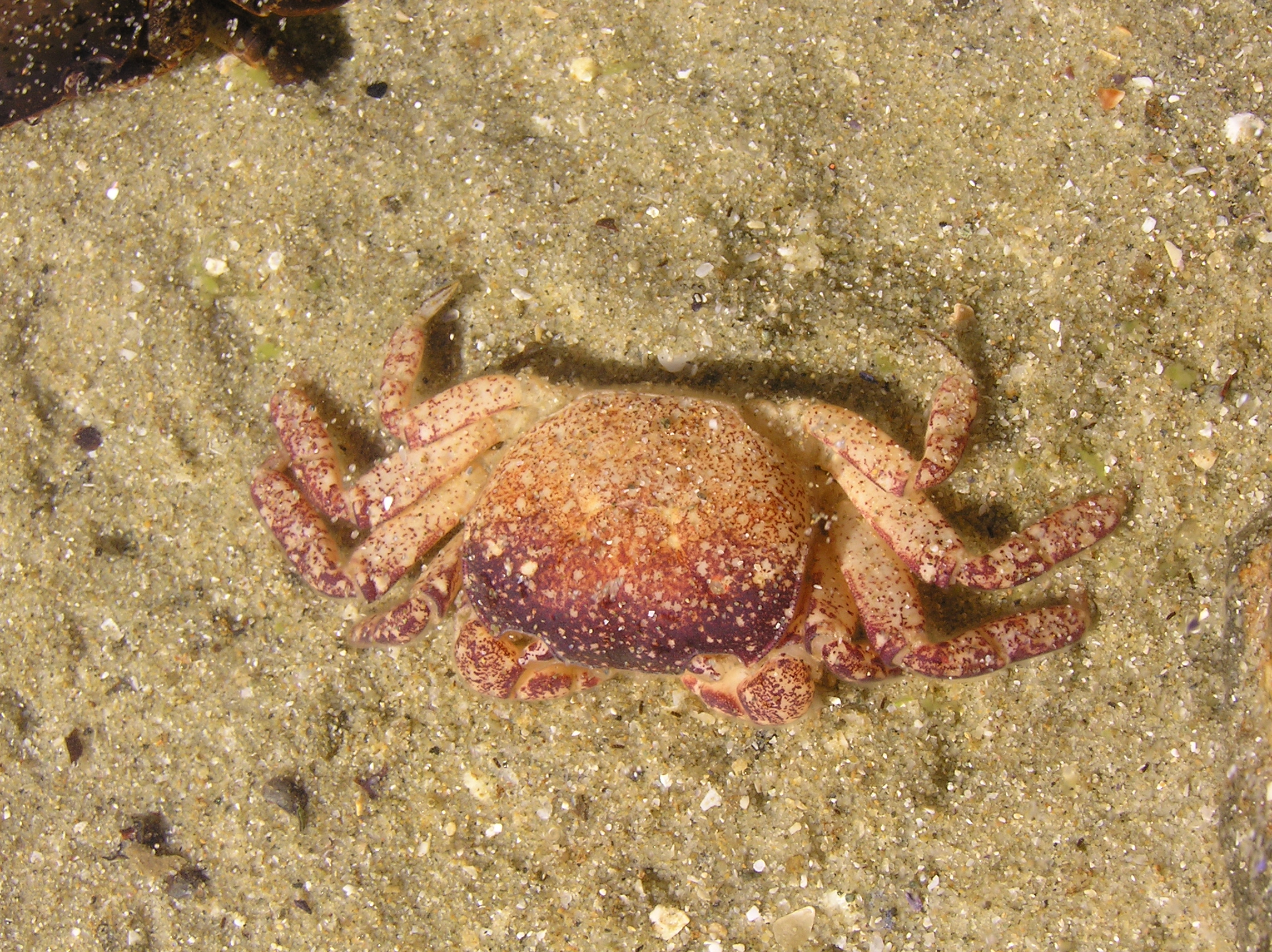
- In a tidal rock pool

Scientific classification
- Kingdom: Animalia
- Phylum: Arthropoda
- Clade: Pancrustacea
- Class: Malacostraca
- Order: Decapoda
- Suborder: Pleocyemata
- Infraorder: Brachyura
- Family: Varunidae
- Genus: Cyclograpsus
- Species: C. lavauxi

Binomial name
- Cyclograpsus lavauxi (H. Milne-Edwards, 1853)

= Cyclograpsus lavauxi =

Species of crab

The smooth shore crab (Cyclograpsus lavauxi) is a marine large-eyed crab of the family Grapsidae, found in New Zealand and the Juan Fernández Islands of Chile.

== Description ==
Cyclograpsus lavauxi is a small, temperate crab in the Grapsidae family. The adult males average 28 mm and females average 26 mm. The shell, or carapace, is polished and is wider than it is long. On average, the crab is 9 mm long and has a width of 11 mm. The brim of the C. lavauxi carapace is smooth. The anterior of the carapace is linear-edged, with two eye orbits, which are curved and situated in the two frontal corners. The antennae are well-developed and are used for sensing texture, food, and sound. C. lavauxi has eight legs and two large frontal pincers. Its legs are compressed, slender, and long, and have six lines of hair running the full 4mm length of the legs, which are fairly robust. The first, second, and third legs also have small tufts of hair between them. Its long legs enable it to run at rapid speeds. C. lavauxi is agile and alert, resulting in a very mobile and versatile crab.

A number of different color morphs have been observed in C. lavauxi. Their carapace can vary in color between slate blue, bluish-grey, fawn, and yellowish-brown. C. lavauxi carapaces can also contain several shades of grey, green, and brown, often with dark brown and red speckles. The underside of the crab is a lighter plain color than the carapace. The legs display the same coloring as the carapace with brighter speckled colouring.

== Distribution and habitat ==
The smooth shore crab's natural range is New Zealand and Chile in the Juan Fernandez Islands. C. lavauxi has been found to reside in a number of New Zealand sites from the Hohoura Harbour to Westland with significant populations in the North Island.

C. lavauxi can be found in a variety of environments, including boulders, under stones, and on beaches ranging from exposed shores to protected bays. It is a common crab on New Zealand beaches, outnumbering the larger common rock crab species. It is found near the littoral sea margin, where it is only barely or not at all wetted. It has also been discovered on mudflats, estuaries, and rocky coastlines. Younger crabs prefer the lower lines of the shoreline and mudflats, whereas older crabs prefer the higher lines of the foreshore and mudflats. During the summer, all C. lavauxi migrate to the lower foreshore line.

== Life cycle/phenology ==
The mating season of C. lavauxi is during the summer months from mid-October to late December. This mating season is highly synchronous within the population. The crabs are not monogamous, and both females and males will mate multiple times during the breeding season. During this reproduction season, male-male competition is frequently displayed. Bigger males will often attack other males in the process of mating with a female, frequently giving the female an opportunity to escape. Likely due to this competition, mating pairs can be found under rocks to hide from other males who might interfere.

During mating, males approach a female and hold on to her carapace for an hour, after which there is a two-hour-long copulation. Oftentimes females will resist males and try to escape.

Females carry eggs between November and February and have a short reception time of fewer than 24 hours, or almost a week in captivity. They oviposit their eggs in synchronization with others in the population within a four-week period, laying thousands of eggs in each batch. Females who are unable to mate during the breeding season are able to lay fertile eggs by storing sperm from the previous breeding season. This extra sperm is stored in the spermatheca after mating. Females only lay eggs once per mating season.

The eggs initially are a dark purple colour, but grow paler and develop black eyespots as they mature. The eggs are 0.25-0.3 mm in diameter and hatch in about two months. Once hatched, the larvae are just over 1 mm in length.

C. lavauxi tend to moult soon after the breeding season has ended, in late summer to early autumn.

== Diet and foraging ==
C. lavauxi is a scavenger crab, foraging on deceased animals and plants, although in most cases it is a herbivore. Its general diet includes algae, drift and seaweed. The crabs feed only during high tides, and are able to synchronize or modify their feeding pattern to ensure they feed under optimal conditions, maximizing their feeding hours and nutrition intake.

== Predators, parasites, and diseases ==
A number of species predate on C. lavauxi, particularly bird species, due to the crabs' inhabiting the area where the tide does not often reach. Their main predators are generalist birds such as Gulls and Kingfishers. Fish species including the Smooth Hound Fish, Spiny Dogfish, Terakihi, Sea Perch, Moki and Red Gurnard also occur. C. lavauxi are at times able to evade predators by using their quick reactions and speed.

The nematode Ascarophsis sp. and the parasitic isopod Portunion sp. are found in C. lavauxi. The majority of C. lavauxi are infected by the internal parasite Portunion sp. Brockerhoff's study showed the reproduction of female C. lavauxi was remarkably reduced by the parasite Portunion sp., this was believed to be because all parasitized females were castrated, although there were no visible signs of this parasite affecting mating behaviour in the males. The male verse male competition was also not seen to affect the crab that was infected with the parasite Portunion sp. Studies also suggest that females do not avoid either the unparasitized and parasitized males due to there being no visible disadvantages to either.

== Other features ==
C. lavauxi has the ability to live successfully under large amounts of sediment and often more successfully than others within its genus. C. lavauxi displays a number of other unique behavioural traits including its aggressiveness when cornered, raising its pincers to accentuate its size along with showing their paleness. The common body posture of C. lavauxi is being flat with pincers folded and lying on the ground with its walking legs close and side-by-side. When in a raised position, it places its body at a 45 degree angle with its back part still lying on the ground with pincers resting still either flat or poised at the midway mark. Its final position is the tiptoe position with its body angled and lifted off the ground and in the air, pincers still folded but held off the ground with its walking legs fully extended.

C. lavauxi are usually found under stones, with their hind legs grasping stones which pushes the back half of the crab up onto the stone clasping it with its talons with the crab using its other legs to support its weight. This is in order to increase its mobility and stabilize the crab against the effects of tidal action. They also use their pincers and talons to dig burrows and push stones away. These holes have been found to be between 20 and 40 mm deep under the cover of rock. Further, C. lavauxi can make clicking noises with the sound acting as a sort of distant artillery. It is one of the only crabs in New Zealand that can perform such an action.

C. lavauxi has evolved to become a versatile and robust species that is able to cope in extreme conditions that many species of crab in New Zealand cannot. This has resulted in an overall greater abundance and success in its population, leading it to be one of New Zealand's most common crabs.
