= Brachynotus =

Scientific classification
- Kingdom: Animalia
- Phylum: Arthropoda
- Class: Malacostraca
- Order: Decapoda
- Suborder: Pleocyemata
- Infraorder: Brachyura
- Family: Varunidae
- Genus: Brachynotus; De Haan, 1833

Genus of crabs

Brachynotus is a genus of crabs, comprising the following species:

- Brachynotus atlanticus Forest, 1957
- Brachynotus foresti Zariquiey Alvarez, 1968
- Brachynotus gemmellari (Rizza, 1839)
- Brachynotus gemmellaroi (Rizza, 1839)
- Brachynotus sexdentatus (Risso, 1827)
- Brachynotus spinosus (H. Milne-Edwards, 1853)
