= Parapyxidognathus =

Scientific classification
- Kingdom: Animalia
- Phylum: Arthropoda
- Clade: Pancrustacea
- Class: Malacostraca
- Order: Decapoda
- Suborder: Pleocyemata
- Infraorder: Brachyura
- Family: Varunidae
- Subfamily: Varuninae
- Genus: Parapyxidognathus; Ward, 1941

Type species
- Pyxidognathus deianira De Man, 1888

Species
- See text

Genus of crabs

Parapyxidognathus is a genus of crabs in the family Varunidae.

== Species ==
- Parapyxidognathus deianira (De Man, 1888)
- Parapyxidognathus fluviatilis (Alcock, 1900)
- Parapyxidognathus ongia Hsu & Shih, 2024
- Parapyxidognathus tshiansue Hsu & Shih, 2024
