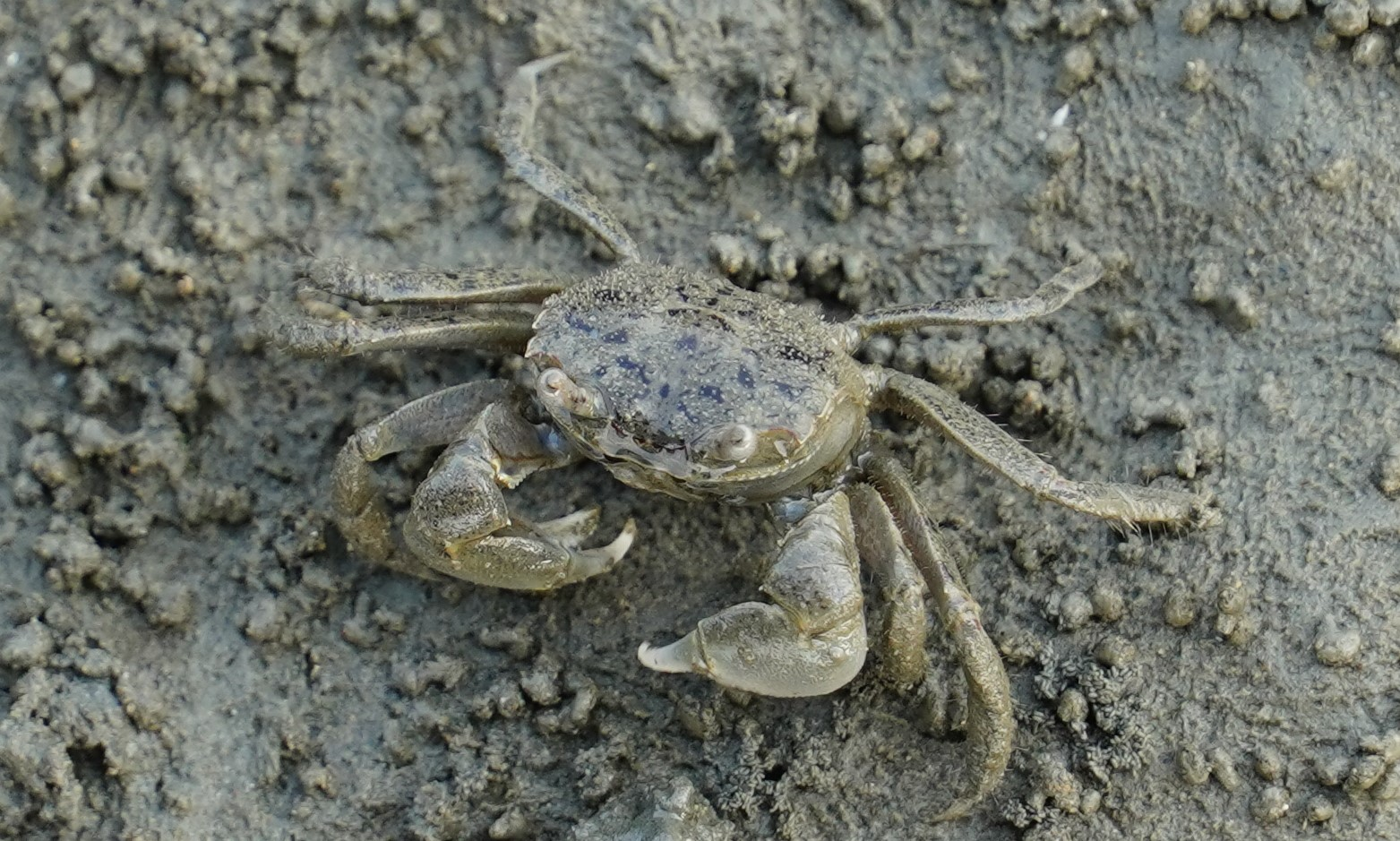
- Helicana doerjesi

Scientific classification
- Kingdom: Animalia
- Phylum: Arthropoda
- Class: Malacostraca
- Order: Decapoda
- Suborder: Pleocyemata
- Infraorder: Brachyura
- Family: Varunidae
- Subfamily: Cyclograpsinae
- Genus: Helicana; Sakai & Yatsuzuka, 1980

= Helicana =

Genus of crabs

Helicana is a genus of crabs, containing three species:

The species reported in Helicana genus are:

- Helicana doerjesi Sakai, Türkay & Yang, 2006
- Helicana japonica (Sakai & Yatsuzuka, 1980)
- Helicana wuana (Rathbun, 1931)
