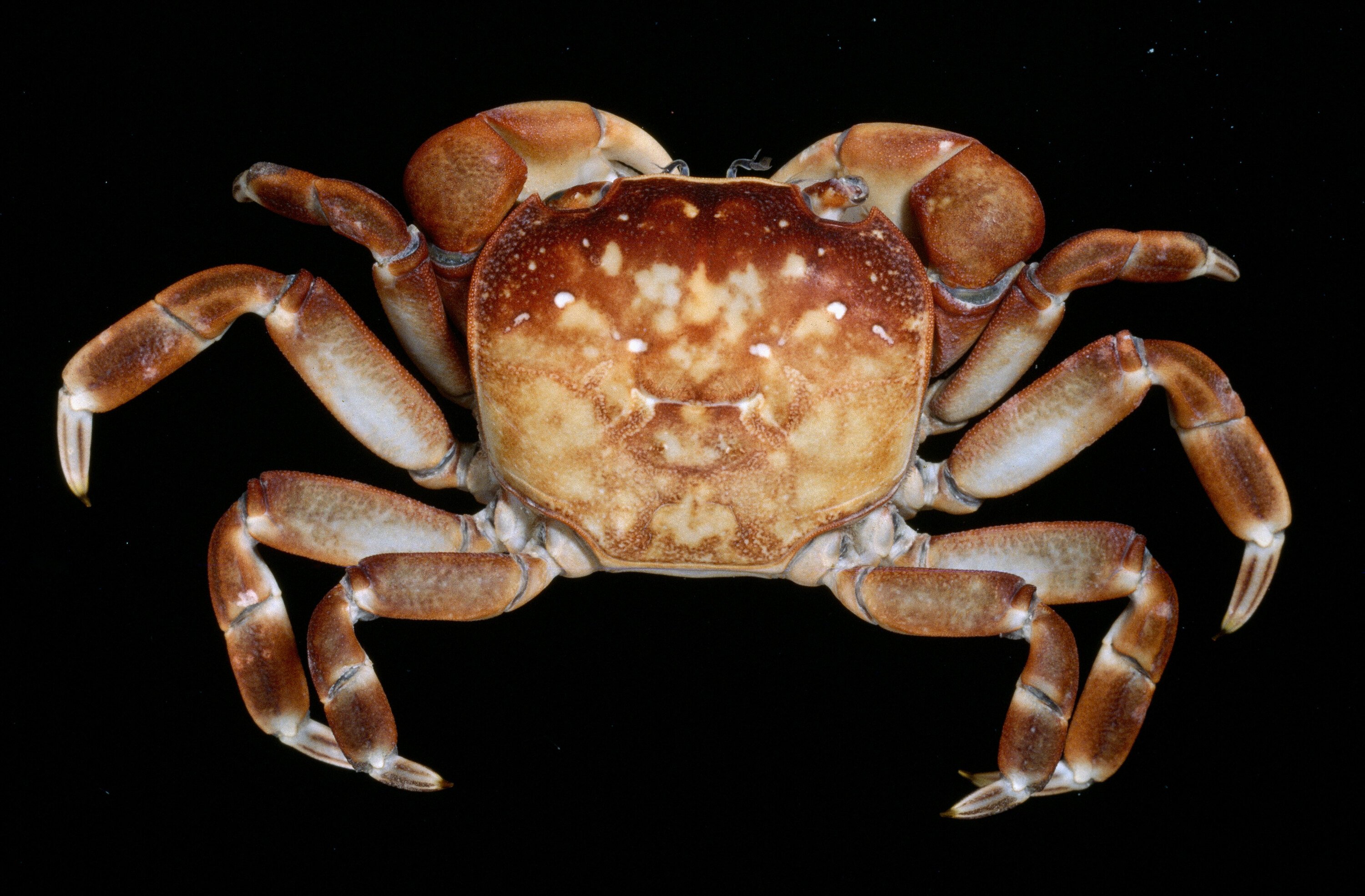

Scientific classification
- Domain: Eukaryota
- Kingdom: Animalia
- Phylum: Arthropoda
- Class: Malacostraca
- Order: Decapoda
- Suborder: Pleocyemata
- Infraorder: Brachyura
- Family: Varunidae
- Genus: Cyclograpsus
- Species: C. granulosus

Binomial name
- Cyclograpsus granulosus H. Milne-Edwards, 1853

= Cyclograpsus granulosus =

Species of crab

Cyclograpsus granulosus, the purple mottled shore crab or smooth shore crab, is an Australasian crab species.

== Description ==
Cyclograpsus granulosus grows to a carapace width of about 38 millimetres (1.5 in), with a carapace mottled with red-brown or purple on yellow. The carapace's frontal regions are granulate, and its lateral margins are convex.

== Ecology ==
Cyclograpsus granulosus is most commonly found on stony or boulder beaches. The species occupies both the supralittoral fringe (a region above the level washed by all tides, but subject to flying spray) and the midlittoral region (above the level not uncovered by all tides). However, the species typically occupies the upper midlittoral region. C. granulosus sometimes scrapes out shallow depressions beneath stones, and is most commonly found under boulders.
