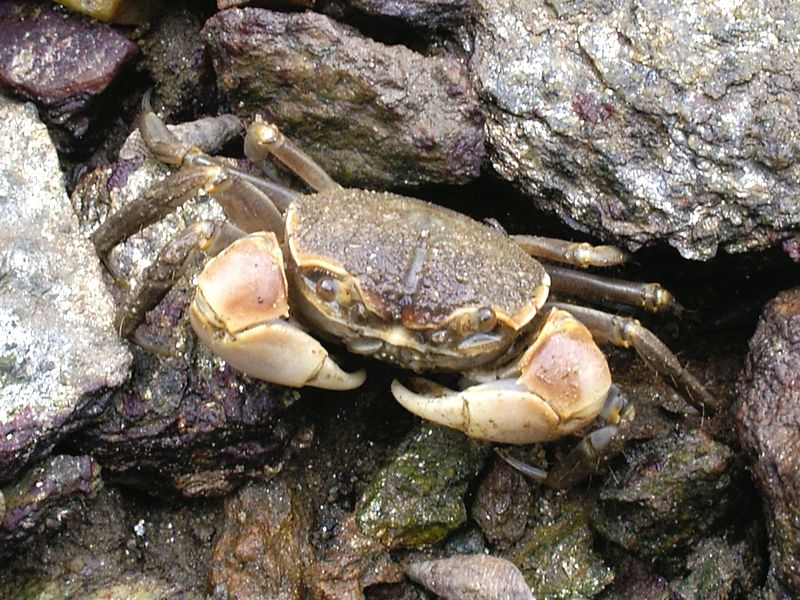

Scientific classification
- Kingdom: Animalia
- Phylum: Arthropoda
- Clade: Pancrustacea
- Class: Malacostraca
- Order: Decapoda
- Suborder: Pleocyemata
- Infraorder: Brachyura
- Family: Varunidae
- Genus: Chasmagnathus; De Haan, 1833
- Species: C. convexus

Binomial name
- Chasmagnathus convexus (De Haan, 1835)

Synonyms
- Ocypode (Chasmagnathus) convexus De Haan, 1833; Helice spinicarpa H. Milne-Edwards, 1853

= Chasmagnathus =

Genus of crabs

Chasmagnathus convexus is a common mud-flat crab of the family Varunidae, which is endemic to East Asia. In Japan, this crab is commonly called hamagani. This crab has two forms that differ in color; one is olive green and the other is purple. Differences in diet are believed to be responsible for the color variation between the two forms. C. convexus is large, relative to related crabs, and can reach 4.5 to 5 centimetres (1.8 to 2.0 in) wide across its carapace. It is predominantly nocturnal.

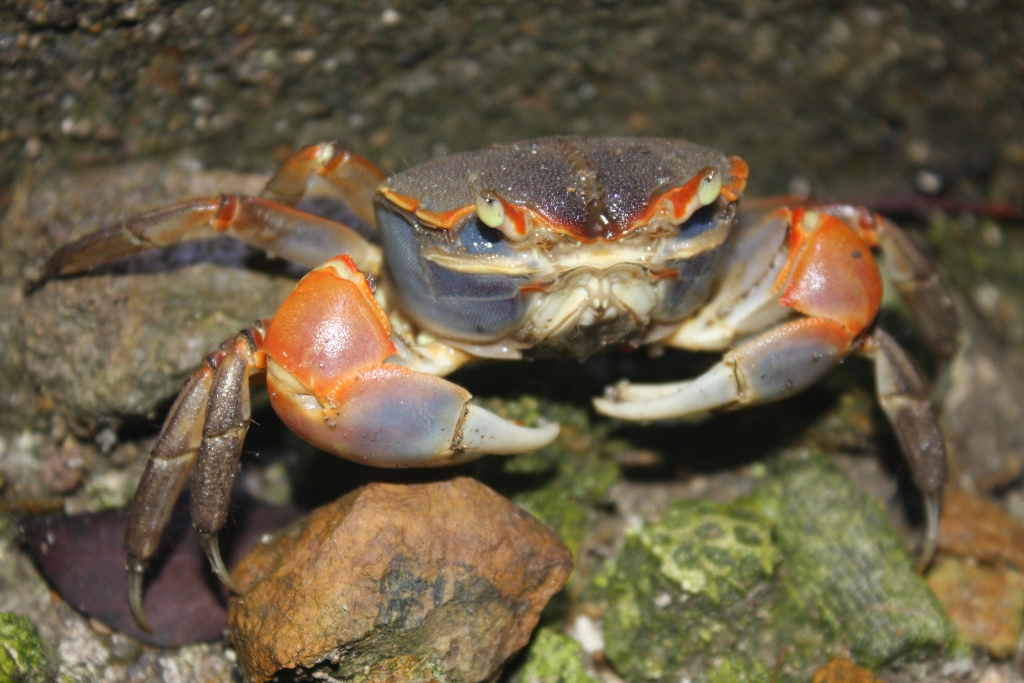
