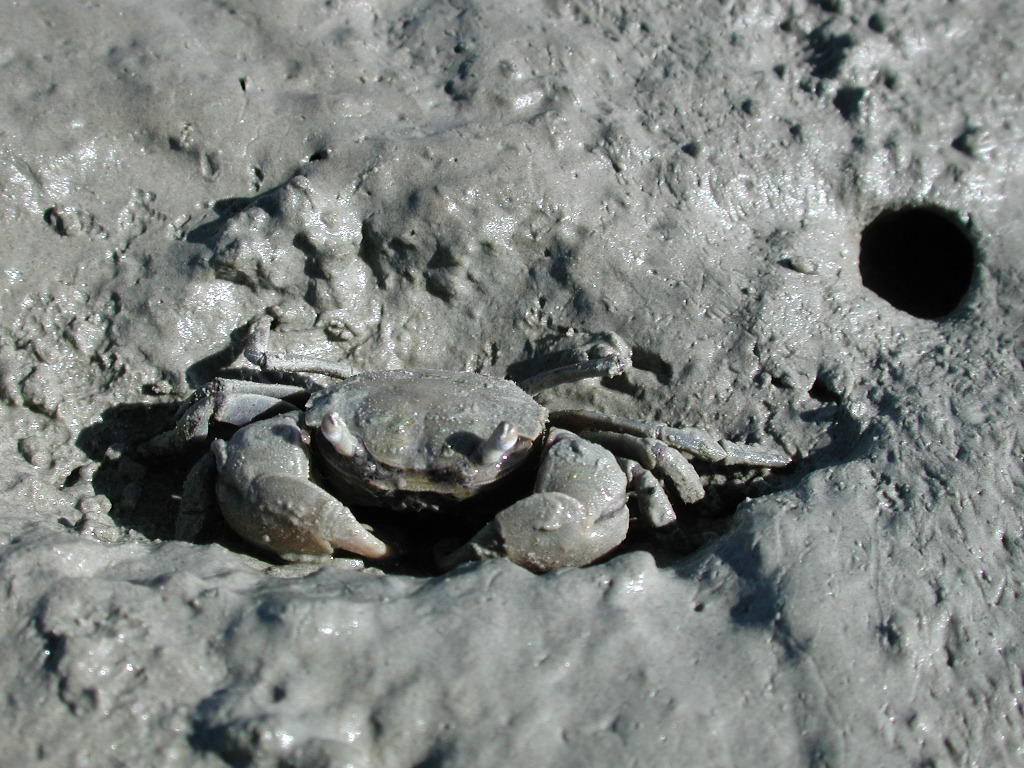

Scientific classification
- Kingdom: Animalia
- Phylum: Arthropoda
- Clade: Pancrustacea
- Class: Malacostraca
- Order: Decapoda
- Suborder: Pleocyemata
- Infraorder: Brachyura
- Family: Varunidae
- Subfamily: Cyclograpsinae
- Genus: Austrohelice; K. Sakai, Türkay & Yang, 2006
- Species: A. crassa

Binomial name
- Austrohelice crassa (Dana, 1851)

Synonyms
- Helice crassa Dana, 1851; Helice lucasi H. Milne-Edwards, 1853

= Tunnelling mud crab =

Species of crab

The tunnelling mud crab, Austrohelice crassa, is a marine large-eyed crab of the family Varunidae, endemic to the sea coasts of New Zealand. Their carapace width is up to 40 mm.
