= Pseudohelice =

Scientific classification
- Kingdom: Animalia
- Phylum: Arthropoda
- Class: Malacostraca
- Order: Decapoda
- Suborder: Pleocyemata
- Infraorder: Brachyura
- Family: Varunidae
- Subfamily: Cyclograpsinae
- Genus: Pseudohelice; Sakai, Türkay & Yang, 2006

Genus of crabs

Pseudohelice is a genus of crabs, containing three species:

The species reported in Pseudohelice genus are:

- Pseudohelice annamalai Prema, Hsu, Shih & Ravichandran, 2022
- Pseudohelice latreilli (H. Milne Edwards, 1837)
- Pseudohelice subquadrata (Dana, 1851)
