= Pachacámac Islands =

Islands in Peru

Coordinates: 12°18′25″S 76°53′56″W

Native name: Islas Pachacámac Nickname: Whale Islands
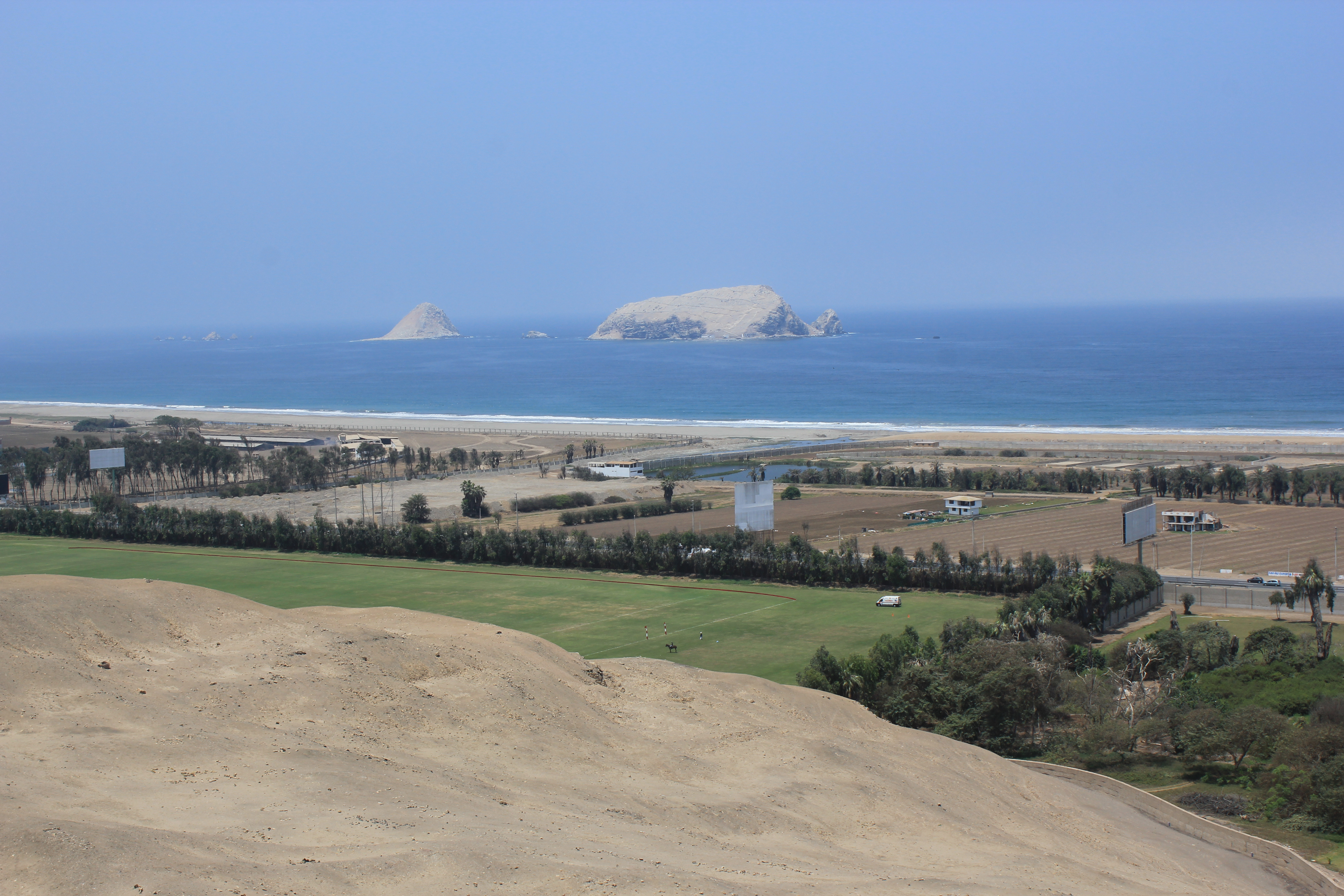
- Interactive map of Pachacámac Islands

Geography
- Location: Pacific Ocean (Mar de Grau)
- Major islands: 2

Administration
- Peru
- Province: Lima
- District: Lurín

The Pachacámac Islands (Spanish: Islas Pachacámac), also known as Cavillaca Islands (Spanish: Islas Cavillaca) or as Whale Islands (Spanish: Isla Ballena), are a group of islands located in the Pacific Ocean, off the coast of Lurín District, in Lima Province, Peru. Its formed by two main islands (the 23,6 ha Pachacámac Island and the 7,05 ha Peñón Pachacámac) and three islets.

They are located about 3 kilometres (1.9 mi) south of the mouth of the Lurín River and about 31 31 kilometres (19 mi) from the city of Lima. The islands have a total area of 31.20 hectares and constitute the habitat of numerous species of seabirds. For this reason, in 2009 the islands were protected by law within the Guano Islands, Islets, and Capes National Reserve System, a natural reserve that protects and conserves representative samples of the biological diversity of the marine-coastal ecosystems of Peru.

== Geography ==
The Pachacámac Islands are oriented in a northwest–southeast direction and are under the influence of the cold waters of the Humboldt Current. They are located between 12º 17' and 12º 20' S latitude and 76° 53' W longitude. The main island, which gives its name to the entire island group, is Pachacámac Island. Of regular height and whitish color, it has an area of 23.6 hectares; and has a maximum length of 880 metres (2,890 ft) and a width of around 430 metres (1,410 ft). Its closest point to the coast is 2 880 kilometres (550 mi). Towards the north of this island is La Viuda, a small islet that appears when the waves and tide end up discovering it.

The Peñón Pachacámac island, also called San Francisco islet, is shaped like a sugarloaf and is the second largest with an area of 7.05 hectares. Between the San Francisco and Pachacámac islands is the El Sauce islet, a small cliff located 265 meters from the main island. Southeast of San Francisco is the Corcovado reef, where the group ends. It is a stand of rocks on the surface of the water, which extends approximately 1 km long and in which the sea bursts. Viewed from a distance, the entire island complex resembles the silhouette of a gigantic whale emerging from the sea.

== Ecosystem ==
The Pachacámac Islands are an important breeding site for seabirds such as red-legged and neotropic cormorants, Peruvbian boobies and Humboldt penguins. Other birds present include guanay cormorants, Peruvian pelicans, Inca terns, Belcher's, kelp, grey, grey-headed and Franklin's gulls, turkey vultures, and American and blackish oystercatchers. The islands have been designated an Important Bird Area (IBA) by BirdLife International because they support significant populations of seabirds.

Two species of marine mammals have been recorded: the marine otter and South American sea lion.

The underwater world of the Pachacámac Islands has a landscape with a lot of life, where fish and marine invertebrates are the most representative taxonomic groups. The most abundant species of fish are represented by the silverside (Odontesthes regia regia), lorna (Sciaena delicious), cabinza (Isacia conceptionis) and cachema (Cynoscion analis). Among the invertebrates are the snail (Thais chocolata), jaiva crab (Cancer porteri) and hairy crab (Cancer setosus).

== See also ==
- Guano Islands, Islets, and Capes National Reserve System
