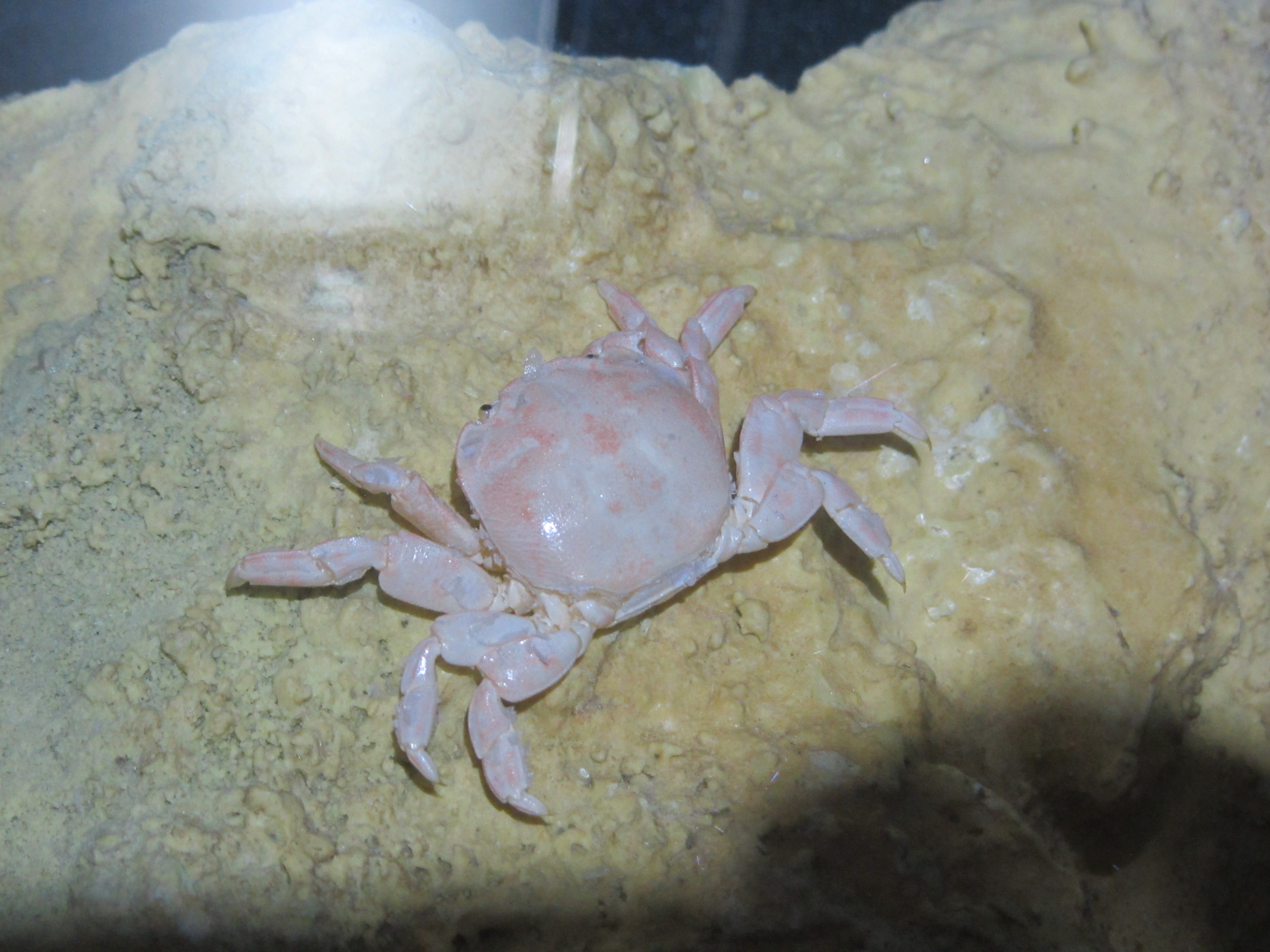
- Xenograpsus testudinatus

Scientific classification
- Kingdom: Animalia
- Phylum: Arthropoda
- Clade: Pancrustacea
- Class: Malacostraca
- Order: Decapoda
- Suborder: Pleocyemata
- Infraorder: Brachyura
- Family: Xenograpsidae; Ng, Davie, Schubart & Ng, 2007
- Genus: Xenograpsus; Takeda & Kurata, 1977

= Xenograpsus =

Genus of crabs

Xenograpsus is a genus of crustaceans belonging to the monotypic family Xenograpsidae. The species of this genus are found in the West Pacific. They are associated with hydrothermal vents.

== Species ==
There are three recognized species:

- Xenograpsus ngatama McLay, 2007
- Xenograpsus novaeinsularis Takeda & Kurata, 1977
- Xenograpsus testudinatus N.K.Ng, J.-F.Huang & Ho, 2000
