= Helice (crab) =

Scientific classification
- Kingdom: Animalia
- Phylum: Arthropoda
- Class: Malacostraca
- Order: Decapoda
- Suborder: Pleocyemata
- Infraorder: Brachyura
- Family: Varunidae
- Subfamily: Cyclograpsinae
- Genus: Helice; De Haan, 1833

Genus of crabs

Helice is a genus of crabs, containing four species:

- Helice formosensis Rathbun, 1931
- Helice latimera Parisi, 1918
- Helice tientsinensis Rathbun, 1931
- Helice tridens (De Haan, 1835)
