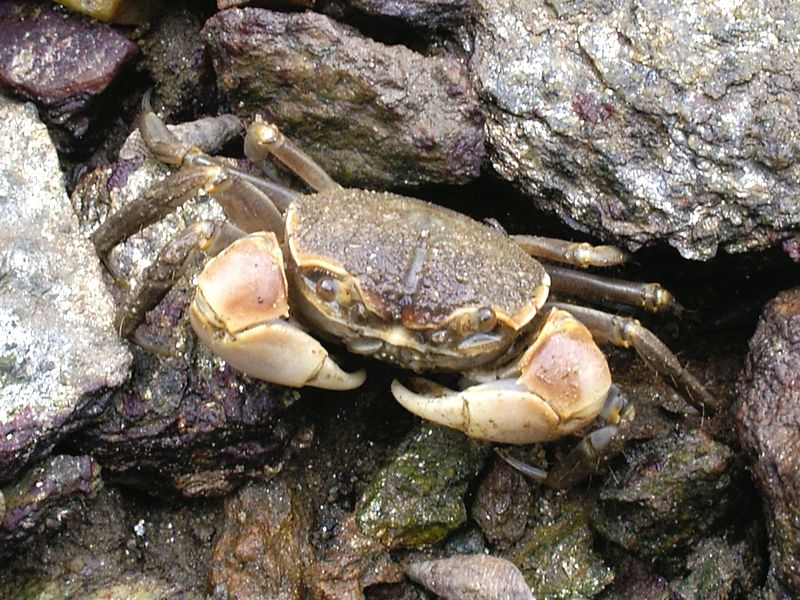
- Chasmagnathus convexus

Scientific classification
- Kingdom: Animalia
- Phylum: Arthropoda
- Clade: Pancrustacea
- Class: Malacostraca
- Order: Decapoda
- Suborder: Pleocyemata
- Infraorder: Brachyura
- Superfamily: Grapsoidea
- Family: Varunidae; H. Milne-Edwards, 1853

Subfamilies
- Asthenognathinae; Cyclograpsinae; Gaeticinae; Thalassograpsinae; Varuninae

= Varunidae =

Family of crabs

The Varunidae are a family of thoracotrematan crabs. The delimitation of this family, part of the taxonomically confusing Grapsoidea, is undergoing revision. For a long time, they were placed at the rank of subfamily in the Grapsidae, but they appear to be closest to Macropthalmus and the Mictyridae, which are usually placed in the Ocypodoidea. It may thus be better to merge the latter superfamily with the Grapsoidea, retaining the latter name as it is older.

That notwithstanding, the revision of the Grapsoidea (in the narrow but apparently still paraphyletic sense) is also not fully completed, as many taxa remain to be restudied. Already, several former Grapsidae genera have been moved to the Varunidae, and others are tentatively placed here pending detailed study. Among the most noteworthy of these is the Chinese mitten crab, Eriocheir sinensis. The genus Xenograpsus, formerly included in the Varunidae, is now placed in its own family, the Xenograpsidae.

The following genera are included:

Asthenognathinae Stimpson, 1858

- Asthenognathus Stimpson, 1858
- Globihexapus † Schweitzer & Feldmann, 2001

Cyclograpsinae H. Milne-Edwards, 1853

- Austrohelice K. Sakai, Türkay & Yang, 2006
- Chasmagnathus De Haan, 1833
- Cyclograpsus H. Milne-Edwards, 1837
- Helicana K. Sakai & Yatsuzuka, 1980
- Helice De Haan, 1833
- Helograpsus Campbell & Griffin, 1966
- Metaplax H. Milne-Edwards, 1852
- Miosesarma † Karasawa, 1989
- Neohelice K. Sakai, Türkay & Yang, 2006
- Paragrapsus H. Milne-Edwards, 1853
- Parahelice K. Sakai, Türkay & Yang, 2006
- Pseudohelice K. Sakai, Türkay & Yang, 2006

Gaeticinae Davie & N. K. Ng, 2007

- Gaetice Gistel, 1848
- Gopkittisak Naruse & P. F. Clark, 2009
- Sestrostoma Davie & N. K. Ng, 2007

Thalassograpsinae Davie & N. K. Ng, 2007

- Thalassograpsus Tweedie, 1950

Varuninae H. Milne-Edwards, 1853

- Acmaeopleura Stimpson, 1858
- Brachynotus De Haan, 1833
- Cyrtograpsus Dana, 1851
- Eriocheir De Haan, 1835
- Grapsodius Holmes, 1900
- Hemigrapsus Dana, 1851
- Neoeriocheir T. Sakai, 1983
- Noarograpsus N. K. Ng, Manuel & Ng, 2006
- Orcovita Ng & Tomascik, 1994
- Otognathon Ng & Stevcic, 1993
- Parapyxidognathus Ward, 1941
- Platyeriocheir N. K. Ng, J. Guo & Ng, 1999
- Pseudogaetice Davie & N. K. Ng, 2007
- Pseudograpsus H. Milne-Edwards, 1837
- Ptychognathus Stimpson, 1858b
- Pyxidognathus A. Milne-Edwards, 1879
- Scutumara Ng & Nakasone, 1993
- Tetragrapsus Rathbun, 1918
- Utica White, 1847
- Varuna Milne-Edwards, 1830
