= Sally Lightfoot =

Sally Lightfoot may refer to:

- Grapsus grapsus, a semi-terrestrial crab species from South America
- Percnon gibbesi, a marine crab species found in the Pacific and Atlantic Oceans, and in the Mediterranean Sea
