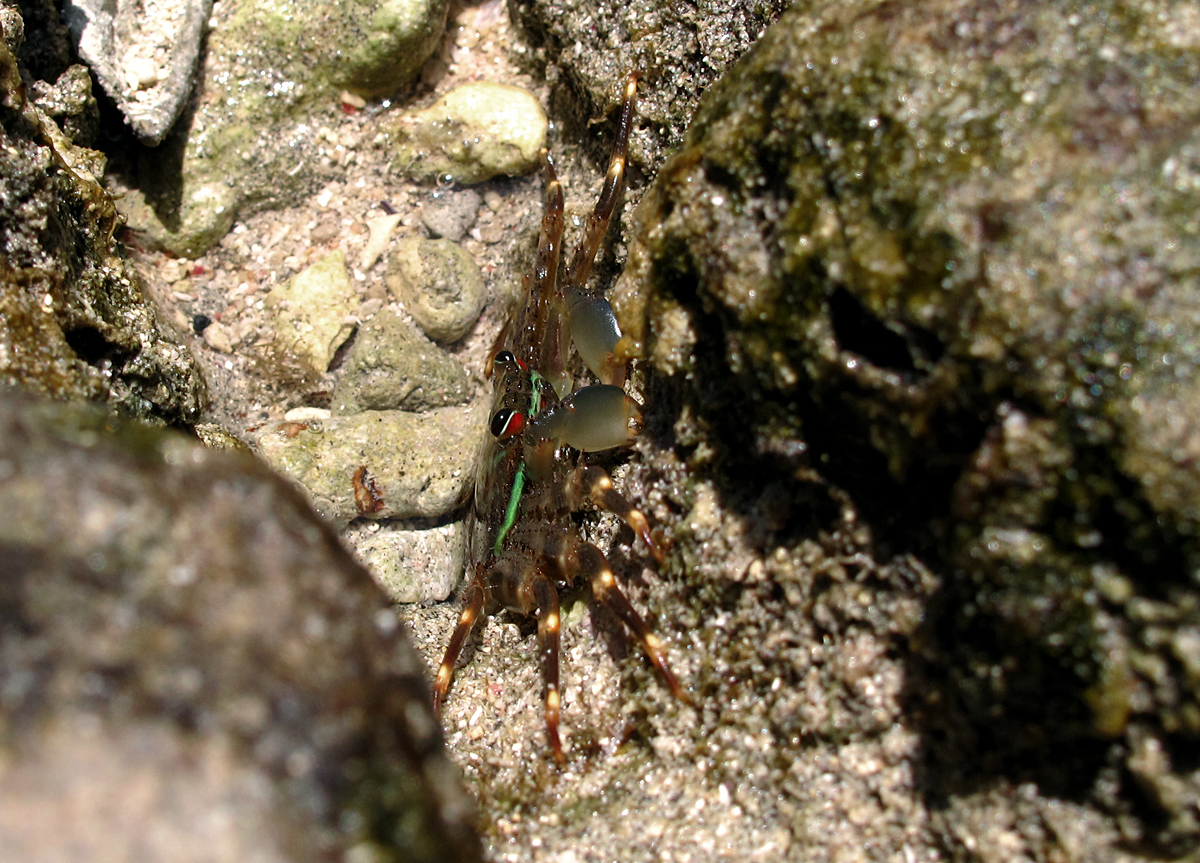

Scientific classification
- Domain: Eukaryota
- Kingdom: Animalia
- Phylum: Arthropoda
- Class: Malacostraca
- Order: Decapoda
- Suborder: Pleocyemata
- Infraorder: Brachyura
- Family: Percnidae
- Genus: Percnon
- Species: P. planissimum

Binomial name
- Percnon planissimum (Herbst, 1804)

Synonyms
- Cancer planissimum Herbst, 1804; Acanthopus planissimus (Herbst, 1804); Acanthopus tenuifrons H. Milne Edwards, 1853; Percnon demani Ward, 1935; Plagusia clavimana Latreille, 1806; Plagusia serripes Lamarck, 1818

= Percnon planissimum =

Species of crab

Percnon planissimum or flat rock crab is a species of crab in the family Percnidae. It is found in the tropical Indo-Pacific from Somalia to Cocos Islands, the Philippines, and Kermadec Islands.
