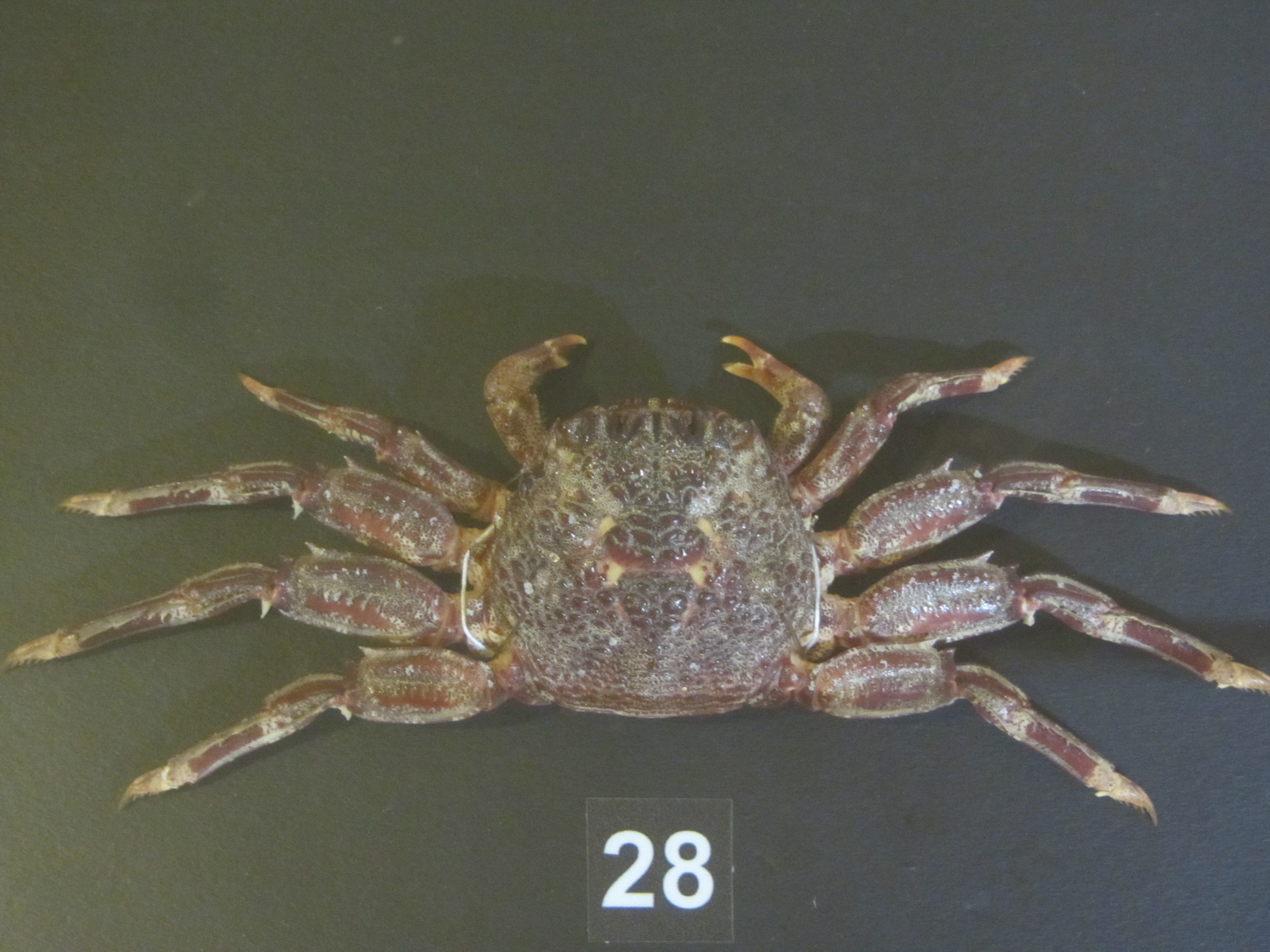

Scientific classification
- Kingdom: Animalia
- Phylum: Arthropoda
- Clade: Pancrustacea
- Class: Malacostraca
- Order: Decapoda
- Suborder: Pleocyemata
- Infraorder: Brachyura
- Family: Plagusiidae
- Genus: Plagusia
- Species: P. squamosa

Binomial name
- Plagusia squamosa (Herbst, 1790)

Synonyms
- Cancer squamosus Herbst, 1790; Grapse tuberculatus Latreille, 1812; Plagusia tuberculata Latreille, 1818; Plagusia orientalis Stimpson, 1858

= Plagusia squamosa =

Species of crab

Plagusia squamosa is a marine crab of the family Plagusiidae, formerly considered a subspecies of Plagusia depressa (as P. d. tuberculata). It is found in tropical Indo-Pacific oceans. P. squamosa's carapace is bumpy and quite coarse, seemingly scaly, leading to its common name: The Scaly Rock Crab.

They are also commonly referred to as "rafting crabs" due to their propensity to live on pelagic marine animals such as sea turtles-- most notably olive ridleys (Lepidochelys olivacea). They characteristically cling and float on organisms or objects. It is still not fully understood of the relationship shared between the crabs and the sea turtles, though it can be hypothesized that the relationship is either mutualistic or commensalistic.

== General diet and historical habitat ==
P. squamosa consumes mostly plant material and some small amphipods within a relatively full digestive tract. The Scaly Rock Crab tends to occupy the intertidal and oceanic zones throughout the Pacific region. The crabs tend to be held to the Indo-Pacific waters. Though known as rafting crabs, the Scaly Rock Crab is normally found on rocky shores when not rafting on an organism or object in open waters.

== Morphology and distinguishable features ==
There are key differences in morphology and mitochondrial DNA that distinguish the scaly rock crab from other crab species it is closely related to. The crabs sometimes get mistaken for the Sally-Light-Foot crab (Gapsus albolineatus). The first morphologic difference occurs in the first zoeal stage in development. There is a distinct shape of the labe from the coaxial joints of the walking legs. They have a body width of five to six centimeters across. Their oval body is convex and covered with small bumps giving it their distinctive "scales". The pincers tend to be short and slender with long walking legs that are fringed with short hairs tipped with pointy claws. Mitochondrial DNA shows a clear genetic difference between P. squamosa and other species closely related to it. The crabs tend to have a large mixture of colors: shades of brown, blue, purple, and orange.

== Effects of climate change ==
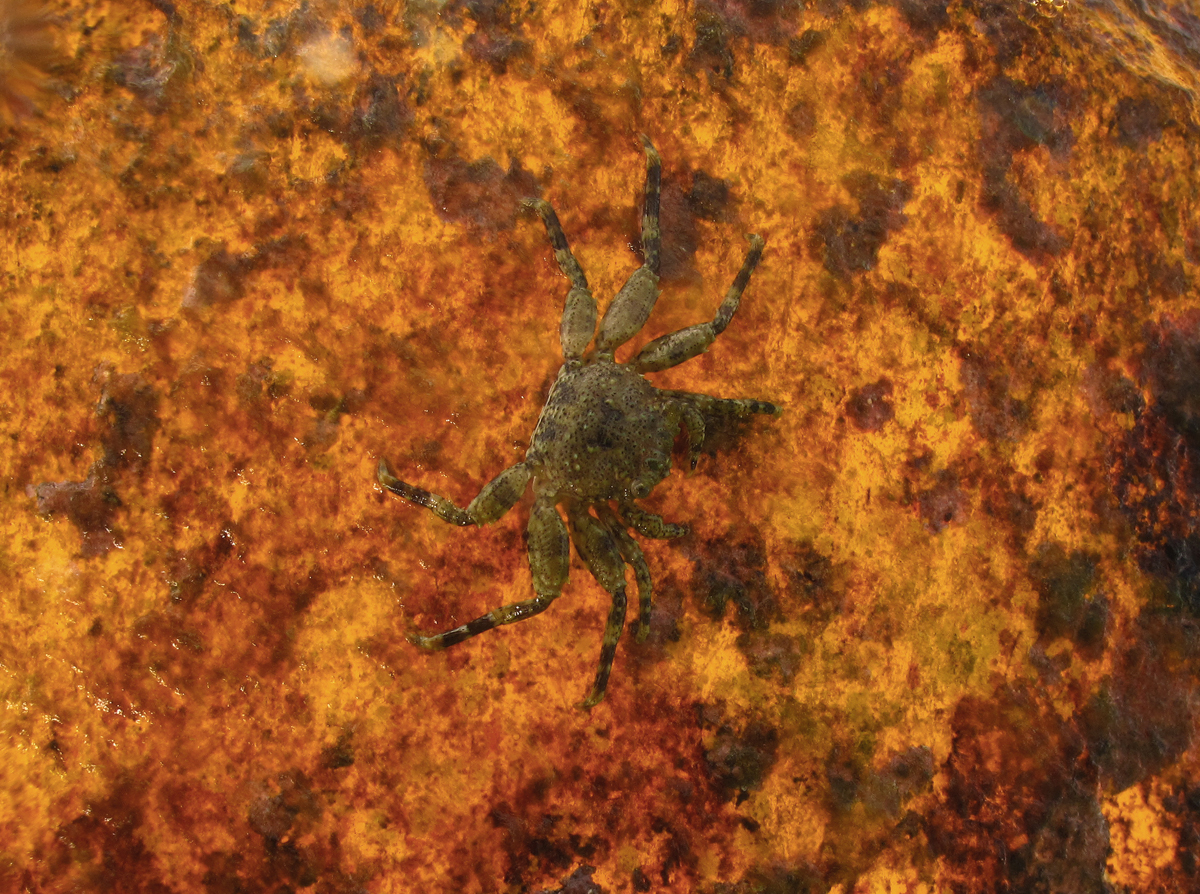
Plagusia squamosa, La Reúnion

The Scaly Rock Crab is largely contained to its Indo-Pacific habitats, but they have relatively recently been seen in the Mediterranean Sea. This is most likely due to human introduction of the species to the region or it is expanding its range due to different ecological stresses placed upon the species.
