= Atol das Rocas Biological Reserve =

Biological reserve in Brazil

- Reserva Biológica do Atol das Rocas
- IUCN category Ia (strict nature reserve)
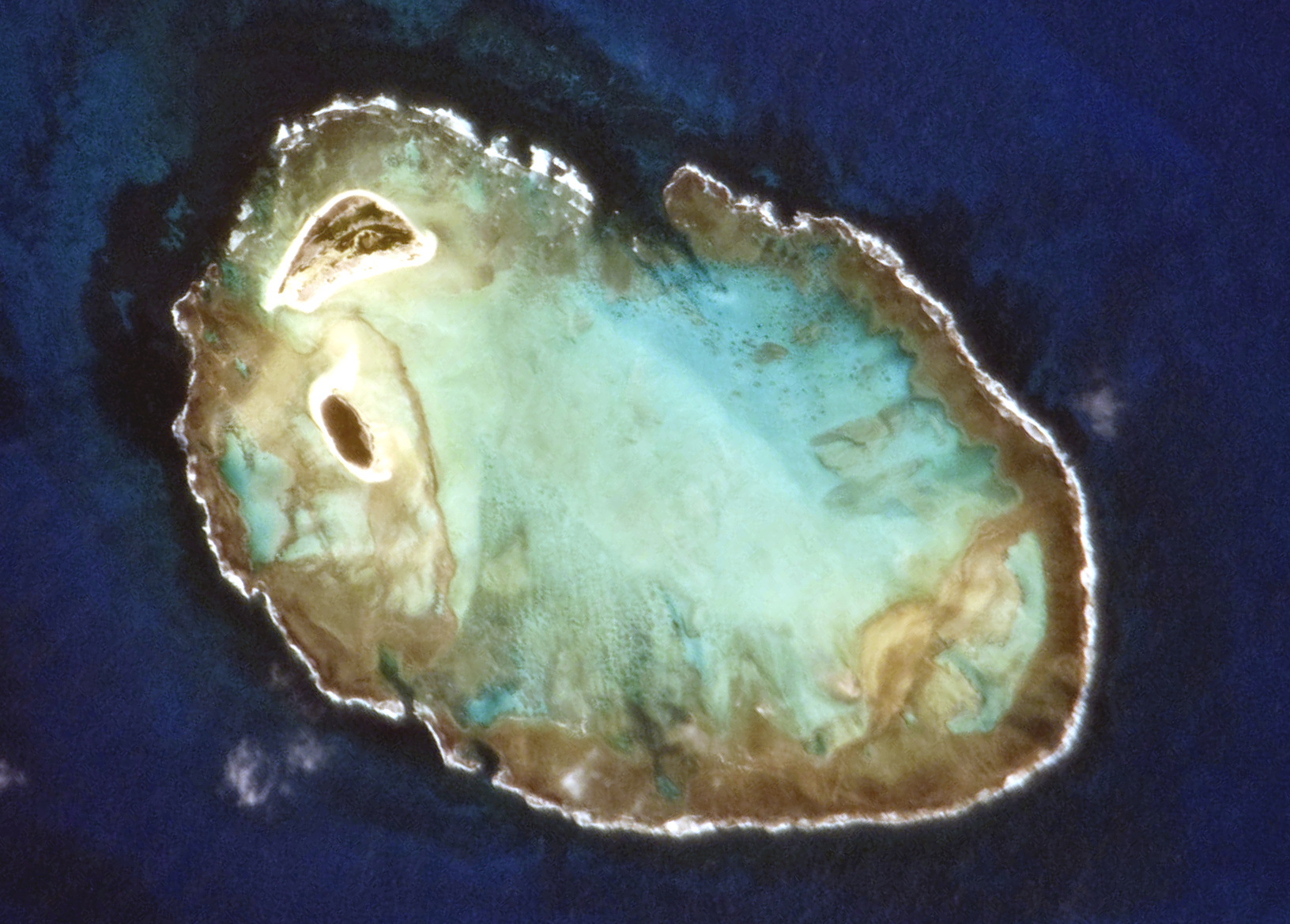
- View from the air

- Location within Brazil
- Coordinates: 3.863°S 33.806°W
- Area: 36,249 hectares (89,570 acres)
- Designation: Biological reserve
- Created: 5 June 1979

Ramsar Wetland
- Designated: 11 December 2015
- Reference no.: 2259

Atol das Rocas Biological Reserve (Portuguese: Reserva Biológica do Atol das Rocas) is a biological reserve in Brazil. It is located on the Rocas Atoll, an atoll 266 km (165 mi) north-east of the Brazilian coast. It was established in 1979 to protect nesting sea turtles and migratory seabirds.

== Geography ==
Rocas Atoll is 266 km (165 mi) north east from the coast of Natal, Rio Grande do Norte in north-east Brazil, and is the only atoll in the south-western Atlantic. The coral atoll is built on the upper, western part of the flat top of a volcanic seamount on the north-eastern part of the Brazilian continental margin. The seamount rises to a depth of 30 to 15 m (98 to 49 ft) below the surface. The distance from the reef to the edge of the top of the seamount is about 1 km (0.62 mi) to the west, 5 km (3.1 mi) to the north-west and 12 km (7.5 mi) to the east.

The sediment in the lagoon and surrounding the atoll is mostly coarse sand, much of which originates from the corals and mollusc shells. The reef has the shape of an ellipse with its axis running east–west, and is about 3.7 by 2.5 km (2.3 by 1.6 mi). There are two small islands inside the lagoon. Ilha do Farol (Lighthouse Island) covers 3.5 ha (8.6 acres) and Ilha do Cemitério (Cemetery Island) covers 3.2 ha (7.9 acres). The highest point is 3 m (9.8 ft) above sea level. The reserve covers 35,186 ha (86,950 acres).

=== Environment ===
Rainfall is 109 millimetres (4.3 in) annually. Air temperatures vary from 18 to 32 °C (64 to 90 °F), with an average of 29 °C (84 °F). Water temperature is very stable at 27 to 28 °C (81 to 82 °F). The islands are remote and have not been affected much by human activity.

=== Wildlife ===
An estimated 143,000 birds use the atoll, mainly masked booby (Sula dactylatra), brown booby (Sula leucogaster), brown noddy (Anous stolidus), black noddy (Anous minutus) and sooty tern (Onychoprion fuscatus). The reserve has been designated an Important Bird Area (IBA) by BirdLife International because it supports significant seabird colonies.

Protected species include the loggerhead sea turtle (Caretta caretta), hawksbill sea turtle (Eretmochelys imbricata), green sea turtle (Chelonia mydas), red-billed tropicbird (Phaethon aethereus), white-tailed tropicbird (Phaethon lepturus), the crabs Johngarthia lagostoma and Percnon gibbesi, the starfish Echinaster (Othilia) guyanensis, lemon shark (Negaprion brevirostris), and the corals Millepora alcicornis (sea ginger) and Phyllogorgia dilatata.

== Conservation ==
The Biological Reserve is a "strict nature reserve" under IUCN protected area category Ia. It was created on 5 June 1979 and is administered by the Chico Mendes Institute for Biodiversity Conservation. The objectives are full preservation of biota and other natural attributes without direct human interference or environmental changes, except for recovery of altered ecosystems and actions needed to restore and preserve the natural balance, biological diversity and natural ecological processes. The reserve has been nominated as a World Heritage Site.

== Sources ==
- Almeida, CE; Marchon-Silva, V V; Ribeiro, R; Serpa-Filho, A; Almeida, JR; Costa, J (May 2000), "Entomological fauna from Reserva Biológica do Atol das Rocas, RN, Brazil: I. Morphospecies composition", Rev Bras Biol, 60 (2), PMID 10959113
- Rebio Atol das Rocas (in Portuguese), Chico Mendes Institute for Biodiversity Conservation, archived from the original on 2016-04-11
- Unidade de Conservação: Reserva Biológica Atol das Rocas (in Portuguese), MMA: Ministério do Meio Ambiente
- World Heritage Nomination - IUCN Technical Evaluation Fernando de Noronha Archipelago/Rocas Atoll Tropical Insular Complex (Brazil) (PDF), UNESCO
