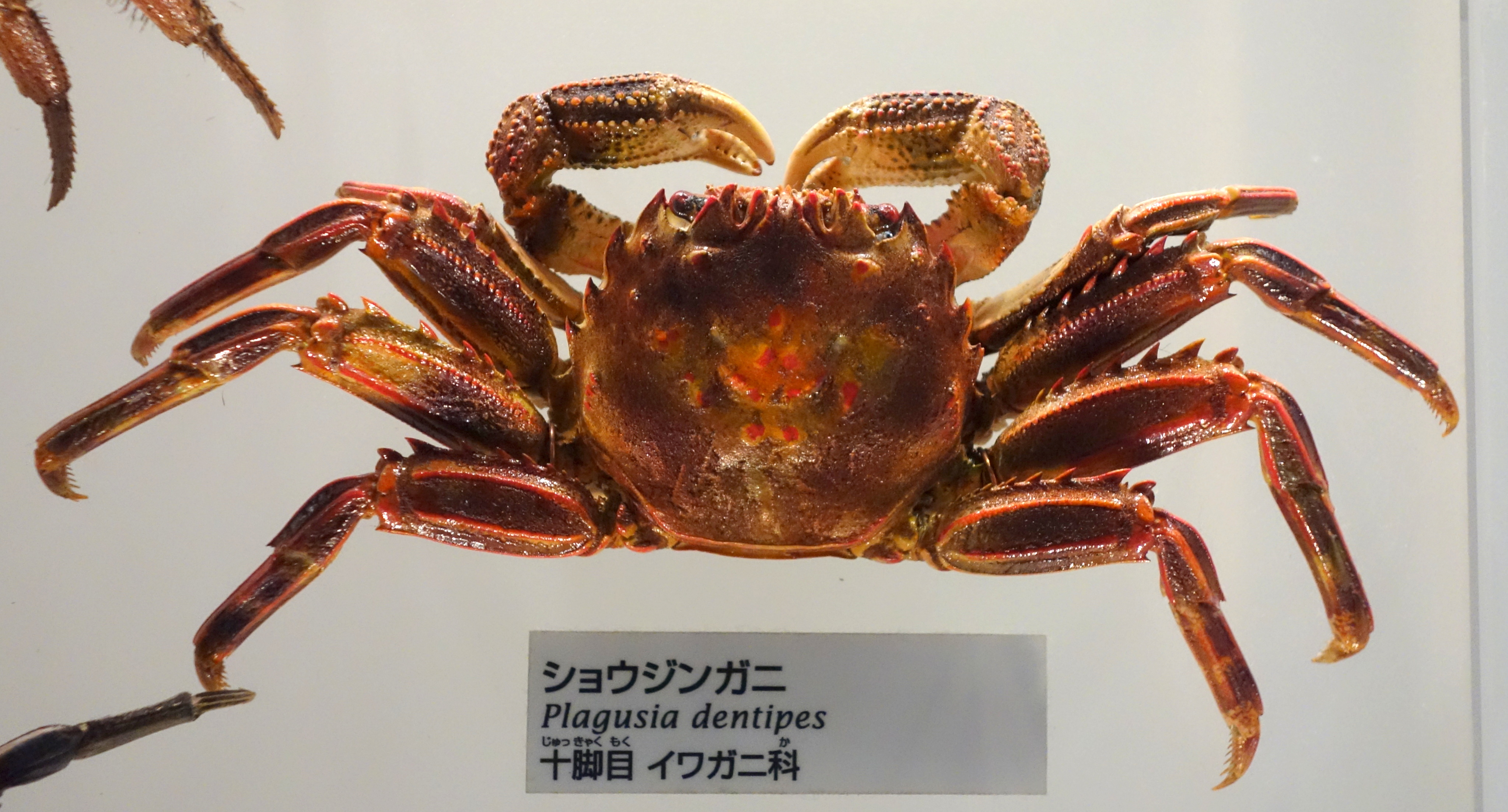
- Plagusia dentipes

Scientific classification
- Kingdom: Animalia
- Phylum: Arthropoda
- Clade: Pancrustacea
- Class: Malacostraca
- Order: Decapoda
- Suborder: Pleocyemata
- Infraorder: Brachyura
- Family: Plagusiidae
- Genus: Plagusia; Latreille, 1804

Type species
- Cancer depressus Fabricius, 1775

Synonyms
- Philyra De Haan, 1833 (preoccupied by Philyra Latreille, 1829)

= Plagusia =

Genus of crabs

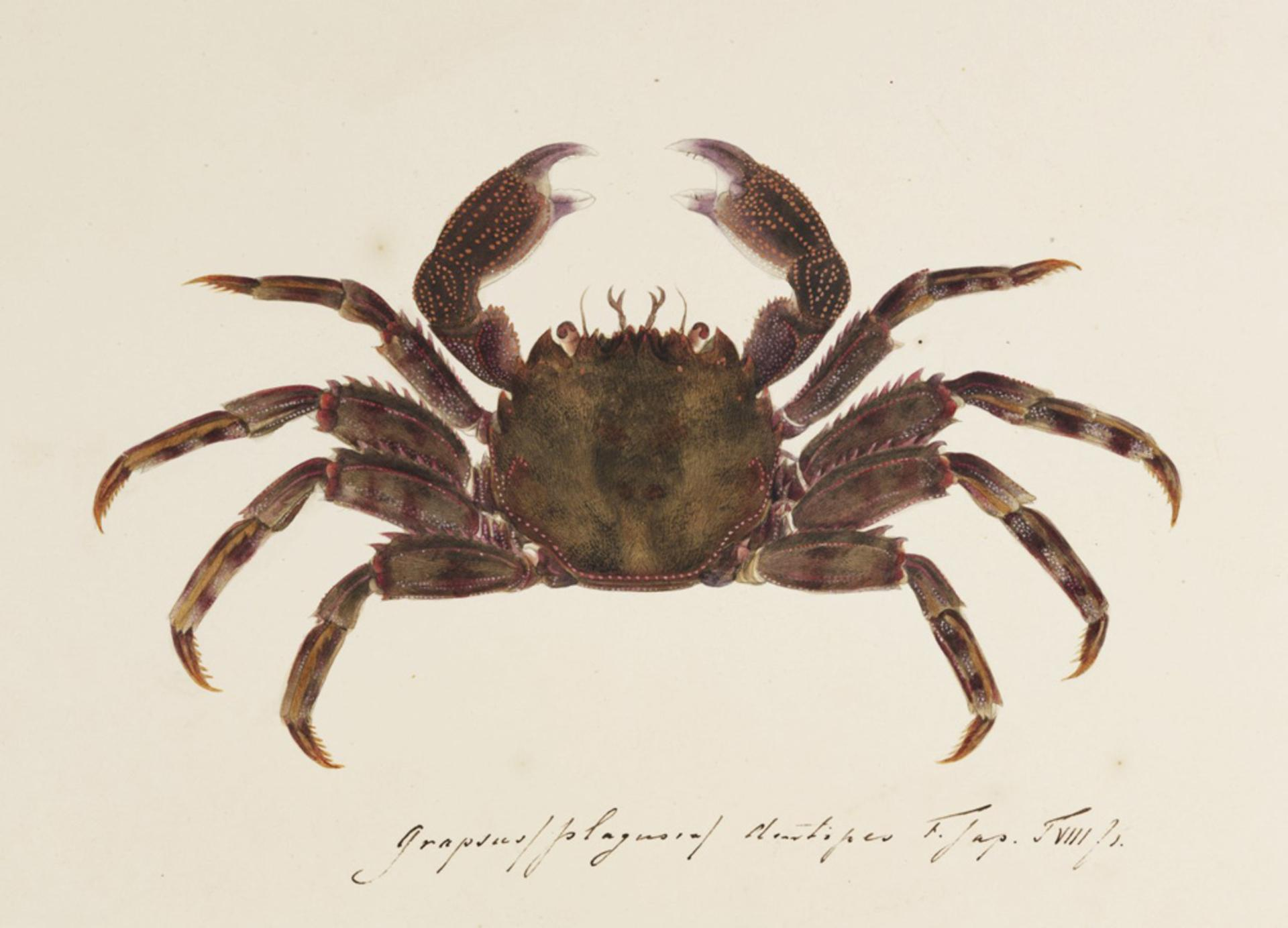
Plagusia dentipes painted by Kawahara Keiga in the period 1823 - 1829.

Plagusia is a genus of crabs in the family Plagusiidae, containing the following species:

- Plagusia depressa (Fabricius, 1775)
- Plagusia immaculata Lamarck, 1818
- Plagusia integripes Garth, 1973
- Plagusia speciosa Dana, 1852
- Plagusia squamosa (Herbst, 1790)
