= Rocas Atoll =

Atoll in the Atlantic

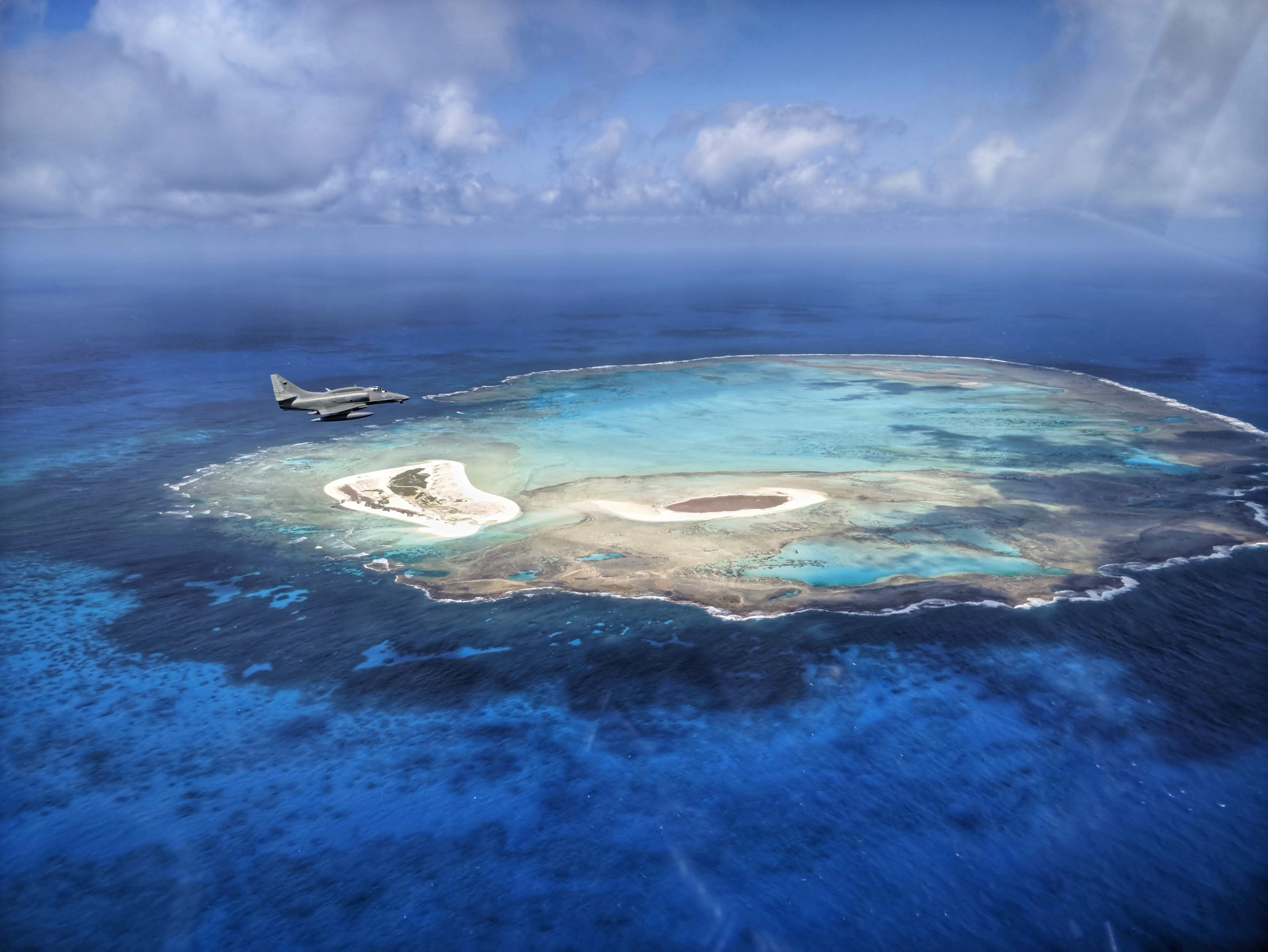

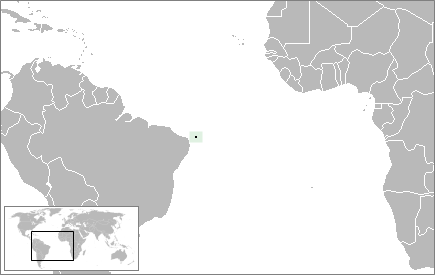

Geography
- Location: Atlantic Ocean
- Coordinates: 03°52′S 33°49′W
- Archipelago: Atol das Rocas
- Total islands: 2
- Major islands: Farol; Cemitério
- Area: 0.36 km^{2} (0.14 sq mi)

Administration
- Brazil
- Region: Northeast
- State: Rio Grande do Norte

Demographics
- Population: Uninhabited

Additional information
- Time zone: Fernando de Noronha time (UTC-02:00)

UNESCO World Heritage Site
- Official name: Brazilian Atlantic Islands: Fernando de Noronha and Atol das Rocas Reserves
- Type: Natural
- Criteria: vii, ix, x
- Designated: 2001 (25th session)
- Reference no.: 1000
- Region: Latin America and the Caribbean

The Rocas Atoll (Portuguese: Atol das Rocas [aˈtɔw dɐz ˈʁɔkɐs]) is the only atoll in the South Atlantic Ocean. It belongs to the Brazilian State of Rio Grande do Norte. It is located approximately 260 km (160 mi) northeast of Natal and 145 km (90 mi) west of the Fernando de Noronha archipelago. The atoll is of volcanic origin and coralline formation.

== Description ==
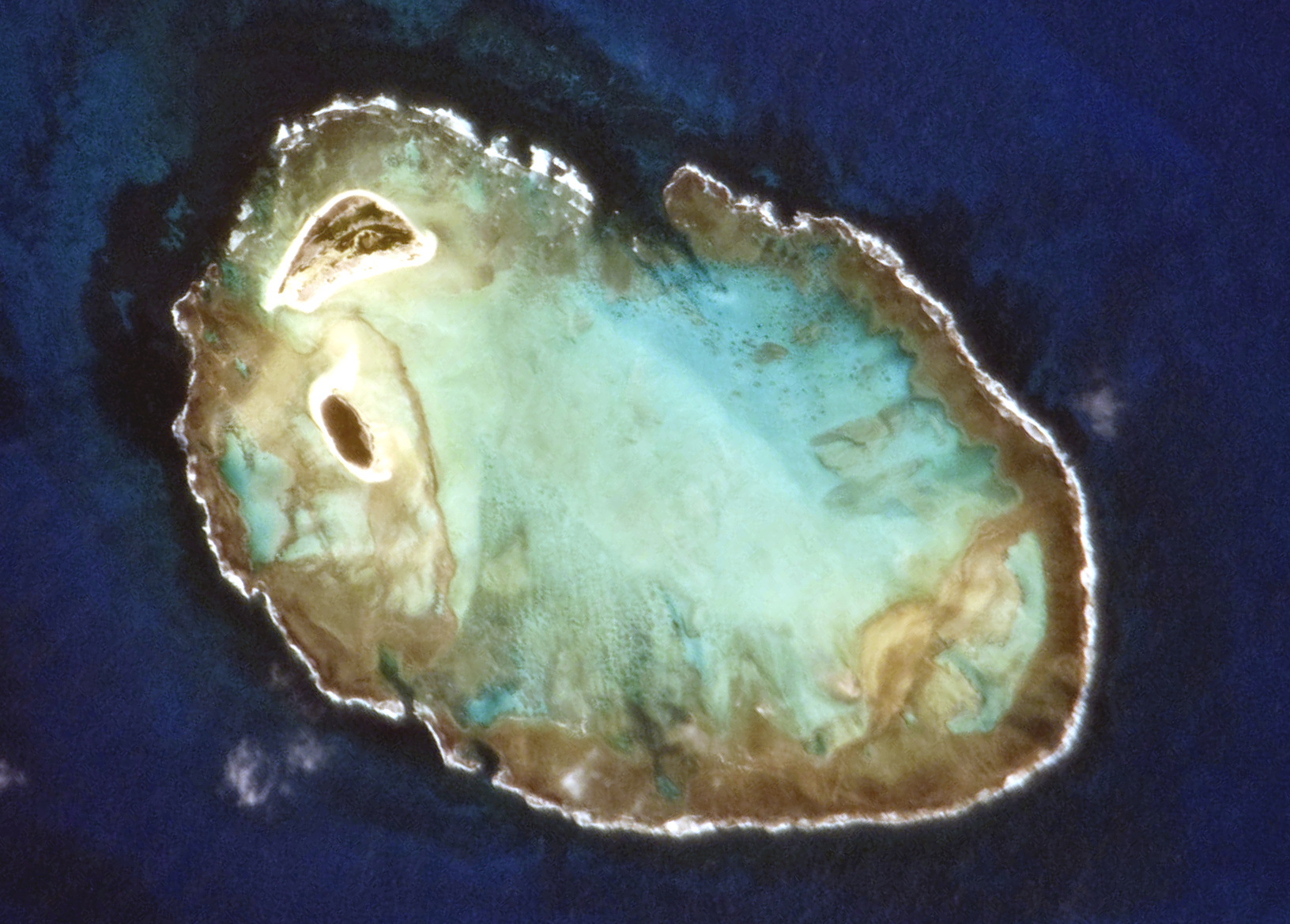
Rocas Atoll, Brazil, photographed from the International Space Station by the crew of Expedition 22.

The oval atoll is 3.7 kilometres (2.3 mi) long and 2.5 kilometres (1.6 mi) wide. The lagoon is up to 6 metres (20 ft) deep and has an area of 7.1 square kilometres (2.7 sq mi). The land area of the two islets (Cemitério Island, southwest and Farol Cay, northwest) is 0.36 square kilometres (89 acres). Farol Cay accounts for almost two-thirds of the aggregate area. The highest point is a sand dune in the south of larger Farol Cay, with a height of 6 metres (20 ft). Both islets are overgrown with grasses, bushes and a few palm trees. The population consists of crabs, spiders, scorpions, sand fleas, beetles, large roaches, and many species of birds.

There is a lighthouse of the Brazilian Navy that has been in operation and maintained since the 1960s, at the Northern end of Farol Bay. In its vicinity is a derelict lighthouse from 1933.

The atoll is a wildlife sanctuary, and in 2001 was designated by UNESCO as a World Heritage Site because of its importance as a feeding ground for marine life. Numerous turtles, sharks, dolphins and birds live in the area. The atoll consists mainly of coral and red algae. The coral ring is almost closed, with a 200 metres (660 ft) wide channel on the north side and a much narrower channel on the west side.

The atoll and surrounding waters are contained in the Atol das Rocas Biological Reserve. The reserve is currently used solely for scientific research. Due to their remote location, the islands remain largely undisturbed by human activities. On the other hand, the remoteness also limits researchers' access to the islands and few studies have been developed on this atoll. The entomological fauna from Atol das Rocas have been recorded.

== See also ==
- Atoll
- List of islands of Brazil
