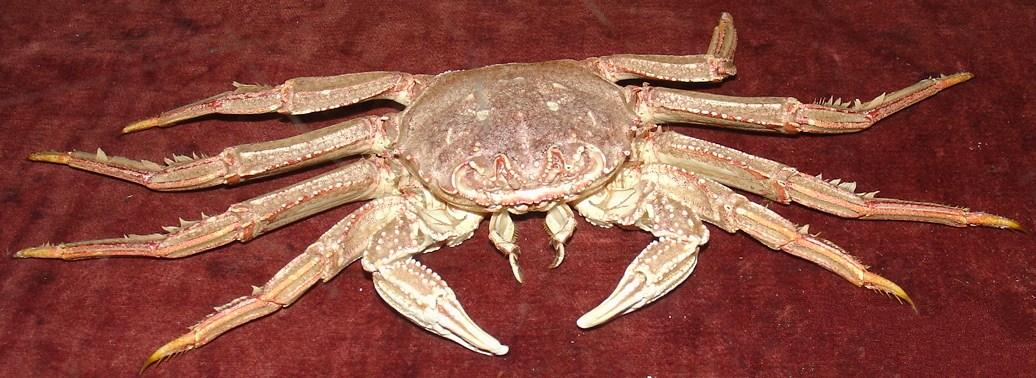
- Guinusia chabrus

Scientific classification
- Domain: Eukaryota
- Kingdom: Animalia
- Phylum: Arthropoda
- Class: Malacostraca
- Order: Decapoda
- Suborder: Pleocyemata
- Infraorder: Brachyura
- Family: Plagusiidae
- Genus: Guinusia; Schubart & Cuesta, 2010

= Guinusia =

Genus of crabs

Guinusia, is a genus of crabs containing the following species:

- Guinusia chabrus (Linnaeus, 1758)
- Guinusia dentipes (De Haan, 1835)
