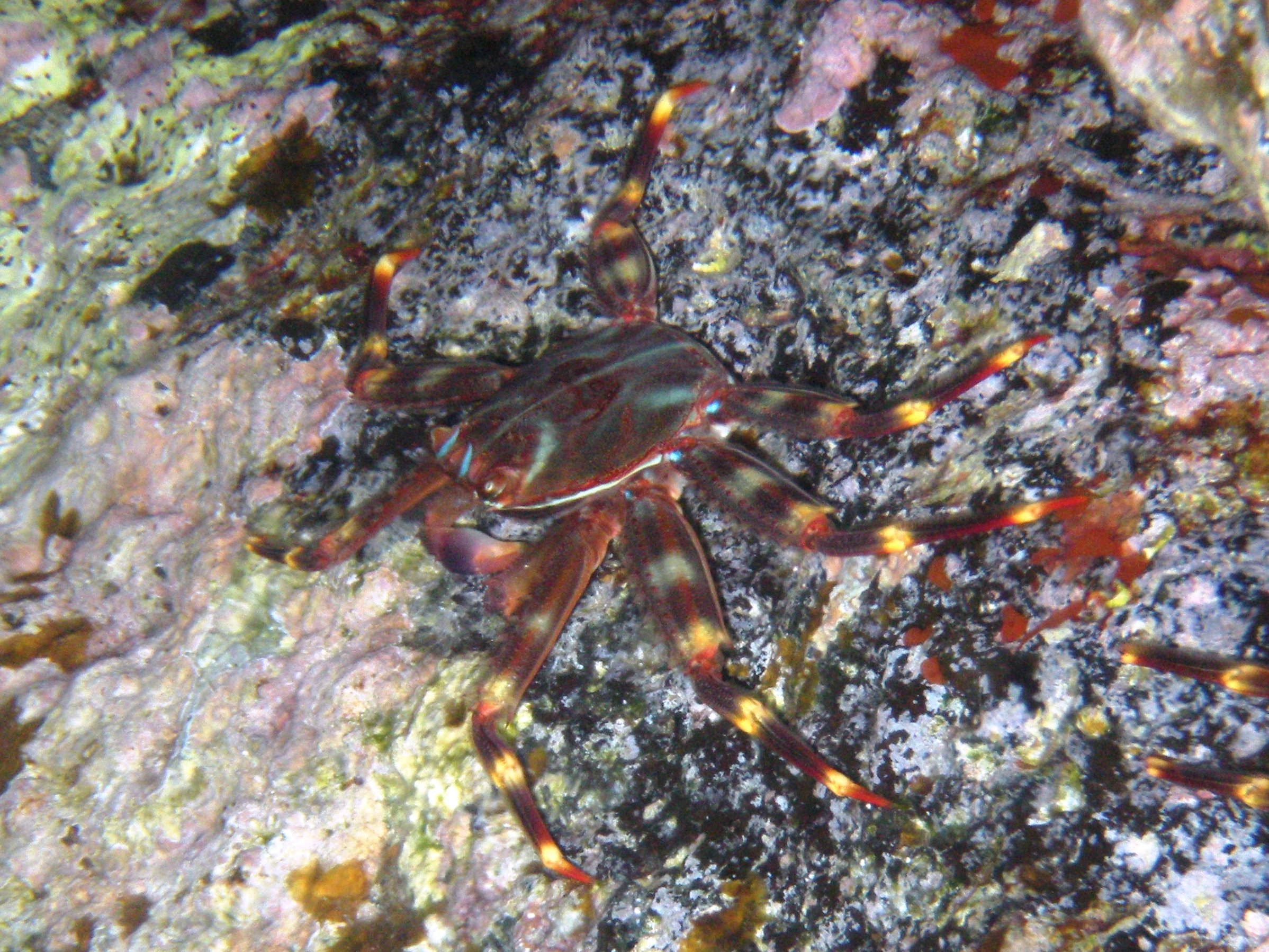
- Percnon gibbesi

Scientific classification
- Kingdom: Animalia
- Phylum: Arthropoda
- Clade: Pancrustacea
- Class: Malacostraca
- Order: Decapoda
- Suborder: Pleocyemata
- Infraorder: Brachyura
- Family: Percnidae
- Genus: Percnon; Gistel, 1848

Synonyms
- Acanthopus De Haan, 1833; Leiolophus Miers, 1876; Liolophus Alcock, 1876

= Percnon =

Genus of crabs

Percnon is a genus of crabs in the family Percnidae. It has also been included in the family Plagusiidae as subfamily Percninae.

== Species ==
Seven extant species are recognised:

- Percnon abbreviatum (Dana, 1851);
- Percnon affine (Milne-Edwards, 1853);
- Percnon gibbesi (Milne-Edwards, 1853);
- Percnon guinotae Crosnier, 1965;
- Percnon pascuensis Retamal, 2002;
- Percnon planissimum (Herbst, 1804);
- Percnon sinense Chen, 1977.

There are two species only known from fossils:

- †Percnon paleogenicus De Angeli, 2023;
- †Percnon santurbanensis Ceccon & De Angeli, 2019.
