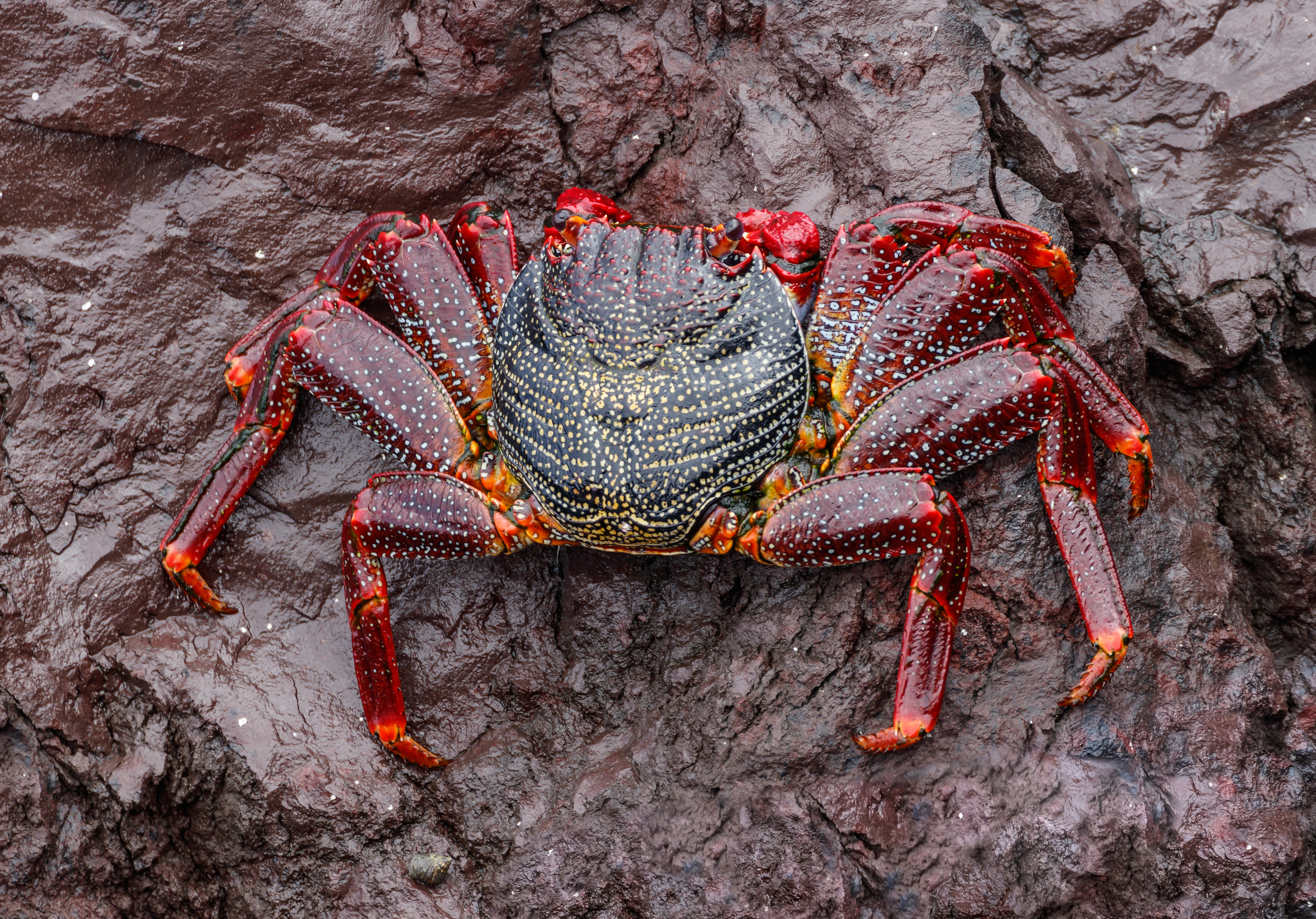

Scientific classification
- Kingdom: Animalia
- Phylum: Arthropoda
- Clade: Pancrustacea
- Class: Malacostraca
- Order: Decapoda
- Suborder: Pleocyemata
- Infraorder: Brachyura
- Family: Grapsidae
- Genus: Grapsus
- Species: G. adscensionis

Binomial name
- Grapsus adscensionis (Osbeck, 1765)

Synonyms
- Cancer adscensionis Osbeck, 1765; Grapsus adscencionis (Osbeck, 1765); Grapsus pictus var. ocellatus Studer, 1883; Grapsus webbi Milne-Edwards, 1853

= Grapsus adscensionis =

Species of crab

The West African lightfoot crab, Grapsus adscensionis, is a species of rocky shore crab found along the coast of the eastern Atlantic Ocean. It is also known as the east Atlantic Sally lightfoot crab.

== Distribution ==
Grapsus adscensionis lives along the Atlantic coast of Africa and along the coasts of several groups of Atlantic islands including Macaronesia, Saint Helena, Ascension Island, São Tomé and Príncipe and Fernando de Noronha.

The crabs demonstrate a preference for rougher terrain with easy access to hiding spots and often congregate around cliffs.

== Discovery and taxonomy ==
Grapsus adscensionis was first described by the Swedish Naturalist Pehr Osbeck as Cancer adscensionis in his 1765 book Reise nach Ostindien und China (Journey to the East Indies and China).

In 1883 G. adscensionis was re-described as a new species by the Swiss ornithologist and marine biologist Théophile Rudolphe Studer who called it Grapsus pictus var. ocellatus.

Grapsus adsceniosis was originally thought to be a synonym or subspecies of the Sally lightfoot crab, Grapsus grapsus. The two species are very similar in appearance with only minor physical differences; namely G. adscensiosis is slightly rounder and the carapace pattern and number and shape of the ventral margin tubercles differ between the two species.

There is no overlap between the range of G. grapsus and G. adscensionis; Freire et al.l note that separation between the two species is maintained by ocean currents (which control the dispersal of their planktonic larvae). Thus prior descriptions of G. grapsus along the east Atlantic Ocean are now attributed to G. adscensionis.

== Morphology ==
The carapace varies in color from reddish-brown to brown-spotted to nearly black and often feature white spots or marbling. The legs may be the same color as the carapace or may have brighter yellow or orange coloration. Coloration varies according to locality and season. West African lightfoot crabs in general have rounded abdomens, though the shape of the abdomen varies somewhat between the sexes; those of female crabs being rounder while those of males are more triangular.

Juveniles are dark brown, black, or gray. Shcherbakova et al. note that this enables them to camouflage against black lava coasts.

Like other crustaceans, West African lightfoot crabs grow by molting. Surveys at different localities on Ascension Island and the Canary Islands have recorded adult sizes as varying between 1.17 - 8.43cm. Crabs from Tenerife appear to be smaller overall and reach reproductive maturity at a smaller size than those from other Canary Islands and Ascension Island. A publication by The Food and Agriculture Organization of the United Nations gives the maximum carpace dimensions of G. adscensionis as 7.7cm in length and 8.7cm in width.

== Behavior and Ecology ==
West African lightfoot crabs inhabit rocky areas of shoreline and spend most of their time in the supratidal zone. They retreat into the water when threatened. Juveniles spend more time hiding than adult crabs. Hartnoll (2007) noted that the crabs are difficult to catch during the day but have a tendency to freeze when confronted at night with a flashlight and thus become easy to collect.

West African lightfoot crabs are diurnal. They spend high tide resting on rocks above the water and descend onto the shore at low tide to feed on exposed algal films. West African lightfoot crabs are opportunistic feeders. In addition to grazing on algae, they feed on worms, mollusks, other crustaceans, turtle hatchlings, and dead animals.

== Reproduction ==
Female crabs breed continuously throughout the year, but appear to have seasonal spawning times which vary by locality. Females have a spermathecae in which they can store sperm after mating.

Female crabs produce a batch of eggs around every 24 days, generally laying once between each molt. One study of West African lightfoot crabs collected from Tenerife estimated that the average female crab produced 69,000 eggs with larger females producing significantly more eggs than their smaller counterparts.

The female crab carries the fertilized eggs below her abdomen until they hatch into planktonic zoae which are released into the water. The first-stage larvae (zoea I) measures around 1.2mm in length. It has a smooth carapace with large rostral and dorsal spines. The zoea has a thin, curved abdomen with five abdominal somites and a bifurcated telson. Somites 2-5 have knob or hook-like projections;; when the larvae enters the second stage, these develop into lateral spines. Second-stage larvae (zoea II) are around 1.6mm in length. The remainder of the lifecycle of G. adscensionis is unknown, due in part to the high mortality rate of zoae reared in a laboratory setting.

== Human interaction/utilisation ==
West African lightfood crabs are not raised commercially for human consumption. The crabs are likely harvested locally, though there are few accounts of this; one fishery report from 1947 does report Grapsus crabs being harvested for consumption in Ghana using circular cast-nets.

The zoeae of West African lightfoot crabs have been studied as potential fodder for commercially important aquatic species such as the common octopus (Octupus vulgaris).

The mitochondrial genome of Grapsus adscensionis was sequenced in 2025.
