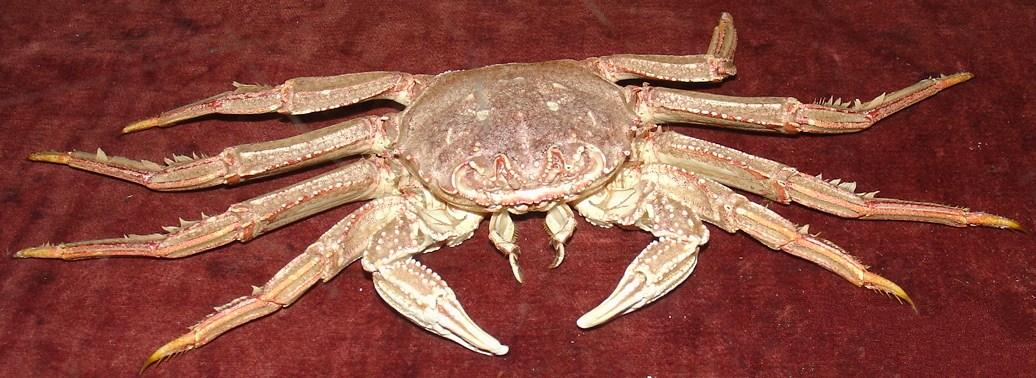

Scientific classification
- Kingdom: Animalia
- Phylum: Arthropoda
- Clade: Pancrustacea
- Class: Malacostraca
- Order: Decapoda
- Suborder: Pleocyemata
- Infraorder: Brachyura
- Family: Plagusiidae
- Genus: Guinusia
- Species: G. chabrus

Binomial name
- Guinusia chabrus (Linnaeus, 1758)

Synonyms
- Cancer chabrus Linnaeus, 1758; Cancer velutinus Linnaeus, 1764; Grapsus capensis De Haan, 1835; Plagusia capensis (De Haan, 1835); Plagusia chabrus (Linnaeus, 1758); Plagusia tomentosus H. Milne-Edwards, 1837; Plagusia spinosa MacLeay, 1838; Plagusia gaimardi H. Milne-Edwards, 1853

= Guinusia chabrus =

Species of crab

The red rock crab (Guinusia chabrus) is a marine large-eyed crab of the family Plagusiidae. It is found in the southern Indian and southern Pacific Oceans, including South Africa, Australia, New Zealand, and Chile.

== Classification ==
Guinusia chabrus is placed in the family Plagusiidae, and was first described as Cancer chabrus by Carl Linnaeus in 1758. Until 2010, it was known as Plagusia chabrus, but then a new genus was erected, named Guinusia in honour of Danièle Guinot.

== Description ==
A sturdy square bodied crab with a smooth dark red-brown carapace and yellow longitudinal ridges on the legs, yellow knobs on the pincers. There may be four white spots on the carapace in a roughly semicircular pattern.

== Distribution ==
Southern Africa: Luderitz to Sodwana Bay, Subtidal to at least 100m.

== Ecology ==
Common on reefs. Often seen in crevices or hiding under other benthic organisms. Scavenger.

With Haliotis midae it makes up the favoured diet of Octopus vulgaris in False Bay, South Africa.
