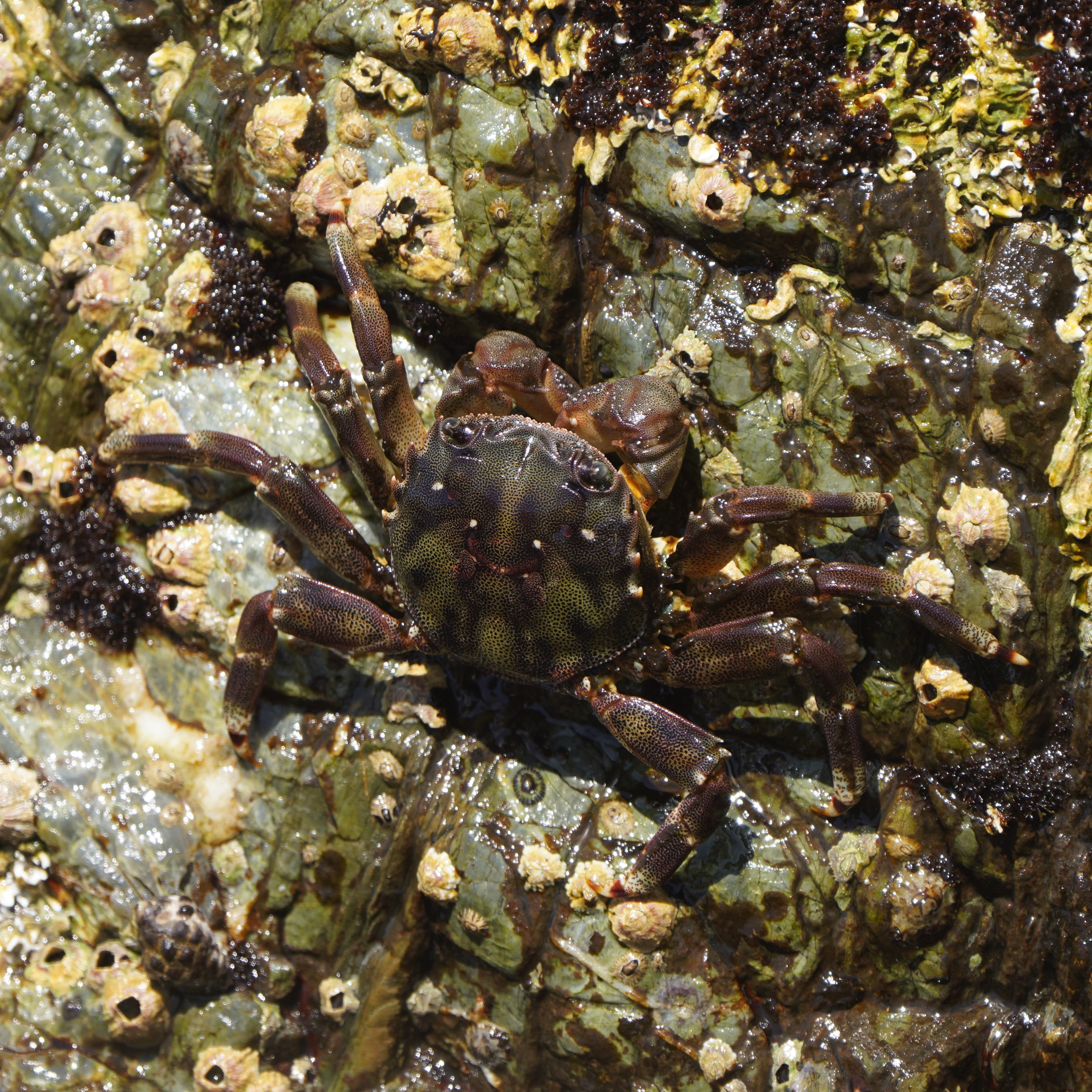

Scientific classification
- Kingdom: Animalia
- Phylum: Arthropoda
- Clade: Pancrustacea
- Class: Malacostraca
- Order: Decapoda
- Suborder: Pleocyemata
- Infraorder: Brachyura
- Family: Plagusiidae
- Genus: Davusia
- Species: D. glabra

Binomial name
- Davusia glabra (Dana, 1852)

= Davusia =

Shiny bait crab

Species of crab

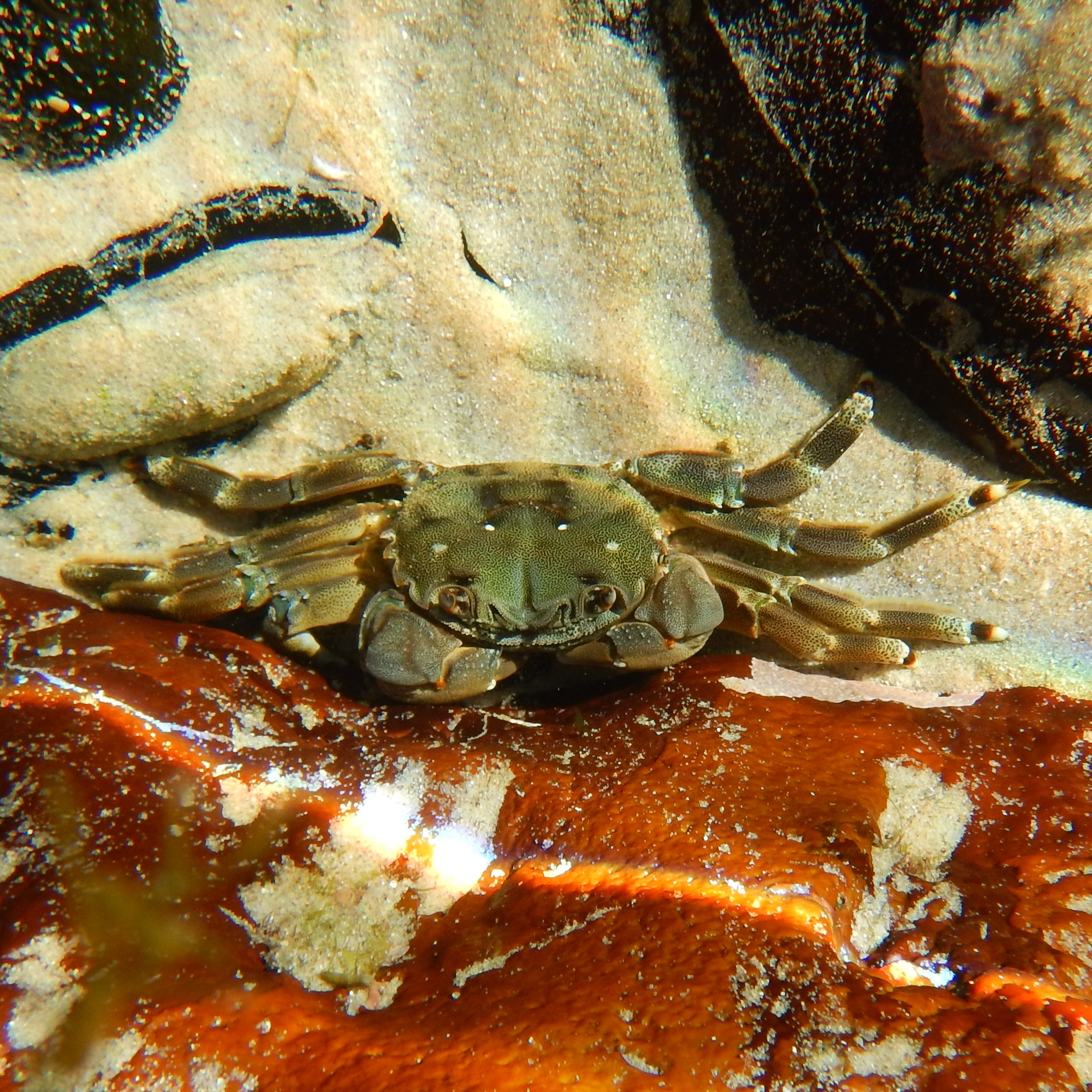
Davusia glabra

Davusia glabra, commonly called the shiny bait crab, Sowrie crab or Sourie crab is the sole species of crab in the genus Davusia. It lives around the low tide area on rocky ocean shores on the eastern coast of Australia (southern Queensland to Victoria), in crevices and rock pools and on rock platforms. Its distribution is stated differently in different sources; some have described the crab's habitat as from Queensland to as far south as the NSW-Victorian border, while others have stated it can be found as far south as Wilsons Promontory (Southern Victoria). Its carapace is grey to fawn-colored with very small green spots, resulting in Davusia glabra having a greenish appearance. The width of the carapace is around 30-40 mm across and is smooth without hair, slightly wider than long, with 3 distinct spines at each edge.

Plagusia glabra is a synonym of Davusia glabra,. The species was placed in the new Davusia genus in 2007 due to differences in morphology from other species in Plagusia.
