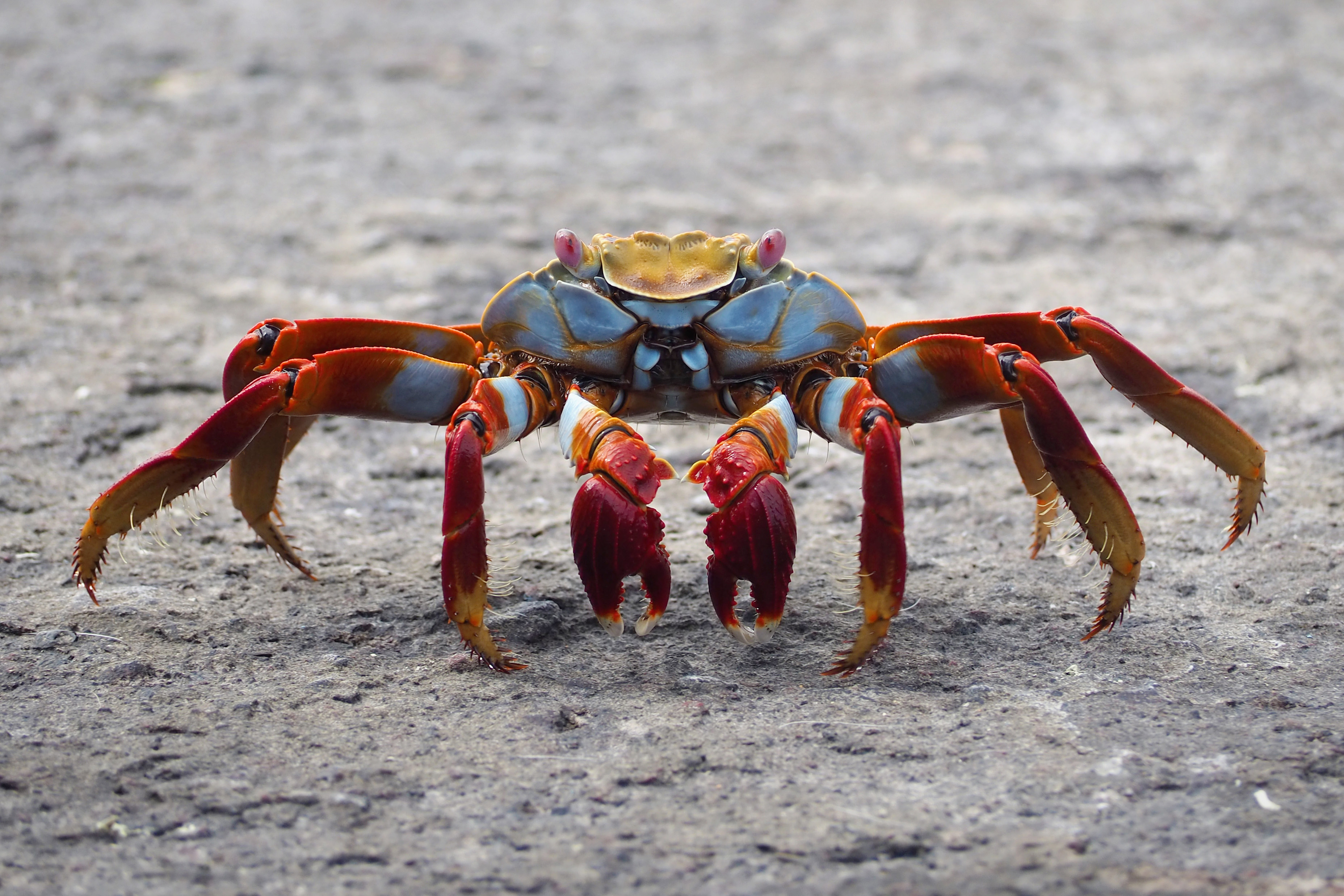

Scientific classification
- Kingdom: Animalia
- Phylum: Arthropoda
- Clade: Pancrustacea
- Class: Malacostraca
- Order: Decapoda
- Suborder: Pleocyemata
- Infraorder: Brachyura
- Family: Grapsidae
- Genus: Grapsus
- Species: G. grapsus

Binomial name
- Grapsus grapsus (Linnaeus, 1758)

Synonyms
- Cancer grapsus Linnaeus, 1758; Cancer jumpibus Swire, 1938; Grapsus altifrons Stimpson, 1860; Grapsus maculatus Milne-Edwards, 1853; Grapsus ornatus Milne-Edwards, 1853; Grapsus pictus Lamarck, 1801

= Grapsus grapsus =

Species of crab

Grapsus grapsus is one of the most common crabs along the western coast of the Americas. It is known as the red rock crab, or, along with other crabs such as Percnon gibbesi, as the Sally Lightfoot crab.

== Distribution ==
Grapsus grapsus is found along the Pacific coast of Mexico, Central America, and South America (as far south as northern Peru), and on nearby islands, including the Galápagos Islands. It is also found along the Atlantic coast of South America, but is replaced in the eastern Atlantic Ocean (Ascension Island and West Africa) by its congener Grapsus adscensionis.

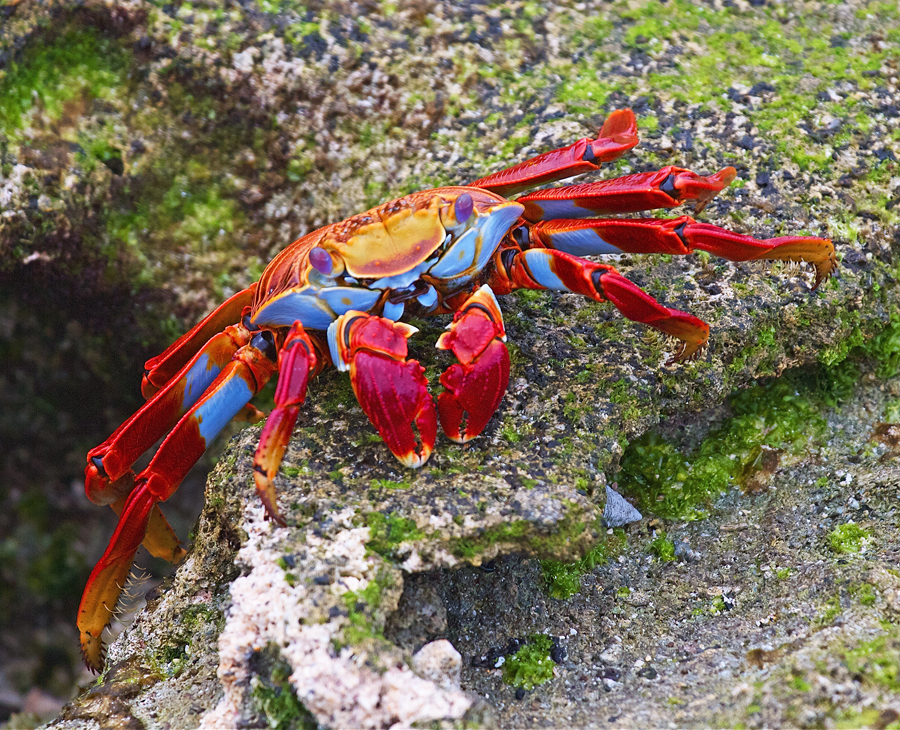
Adult on Santa Cruz Island, Galapagos, Ecuador

== Description ==
Grapsus grapsus is a typically shaped crab, with five pairs of legs, the front two bearing small, blocky, symmetrical chelae (claws). The other legs are broad and flat, with only the tips touching the substrate. The crab's round, flat carapace is slightly longer than 8 centimetres (3.1 in). Young G. grapsus are black or dark brown in color and are camouflaged well on the black lava coasts of volcanic islands. Adults are quite variable in color; some are muted brownish-red, some mottled or spotted brown, pink, or yellow.

== Taxonomy ==
Grapsus grapsus was first described by Carl Linnaeus in the 1758 10th edition of Systema Naturae as "Cancer grapsus".

The species Grapsus grapsus and G. adscensionis were not separated until 1990. The latter is found in the eastern Atlantic, while the former is not. While the validity of the separation into two species has been questioned, there are constant morphological differences in the coloration of the pereiopods and the form of the first zoea larva, and no evidence for any genetic connection between the two populations, and they are generally treated as separate species.

== Ecology and behavior ==
This crab lives among the rocks at the often turbulent, windy shore, just above the limit of the sea spray. It feeds on algae primarily, sometimes sampling other plant matter, sponges, mollusks (such as clams), crustaceans (including other crabs), fish, young sea turtles, bird eggs and droppings, bat guano and dead animals (mainly seals and birds). As larvae, they feed on phytoplankton. They have been known to resort to cannibalism when populations densities are high or food is scarce. It is an agile crab, capable of leaping, and consequently hard to catch. Not considered very edible by humans, it is used as bait by fishermen. It is preyed upon by the chain moray eel, Echidna catenata, as well as by octopuses.

G. grapsus has been observed in an apparent cleaning symbiosis taking ticks from marine iguanas on the Galápagos Islands.

Grapsus grapsus was collected by Charles Darwin during his voyages on HMS Beagle, and also by the first comprehensive study of the fauna of the Gulf of California, carried out by Ed Ricketts, together with John Steinbeck and others. Steinbeck records:

These little crabs, with brilliant cloisonné carapaces, walk on their tiptoes, They have remarkable eyes and an extremely fast reaction time. In spite of the fact that they swarm on the rocks at the Cape [San Lucas], and to a less degree inside the Gulf [of California], they are exceedingly hard to catch. They seem to be able to run in any of four directions; but more than this, perhaps because of their rapid reaction time, they appear to read the mind of their hunter.

== Gallery ==
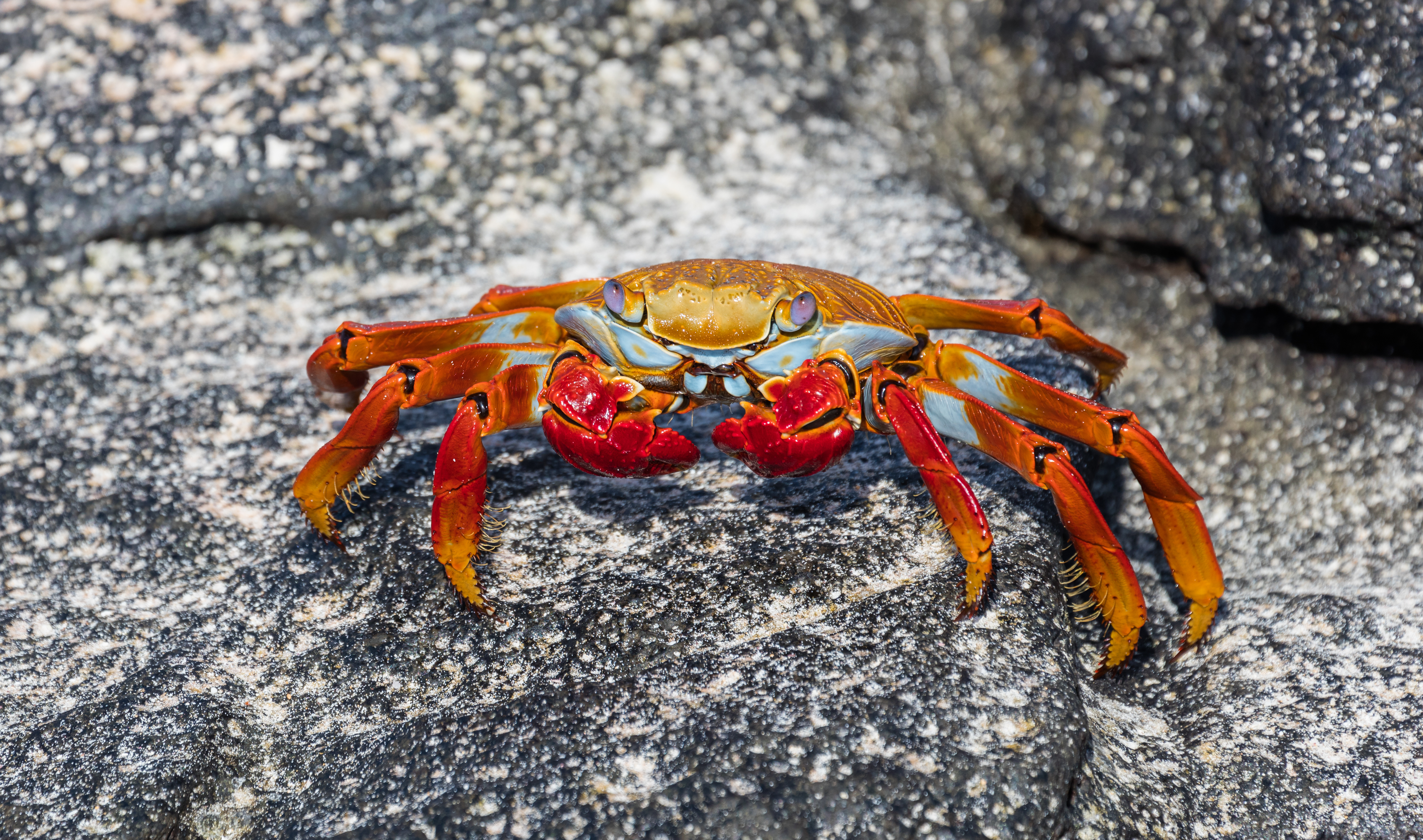
Baltra, Galapagos Islands

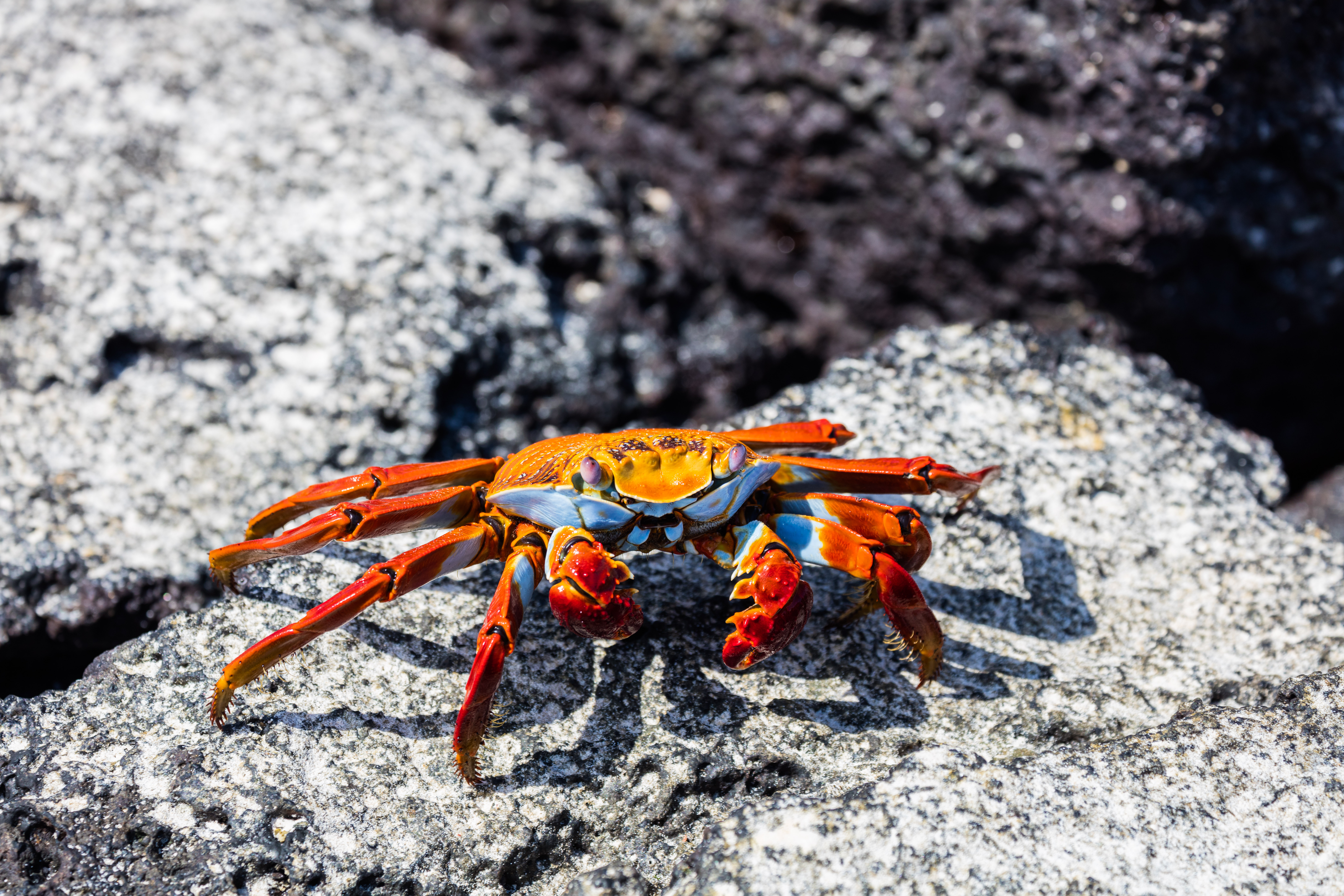
Baltra, Galapagos Islands.

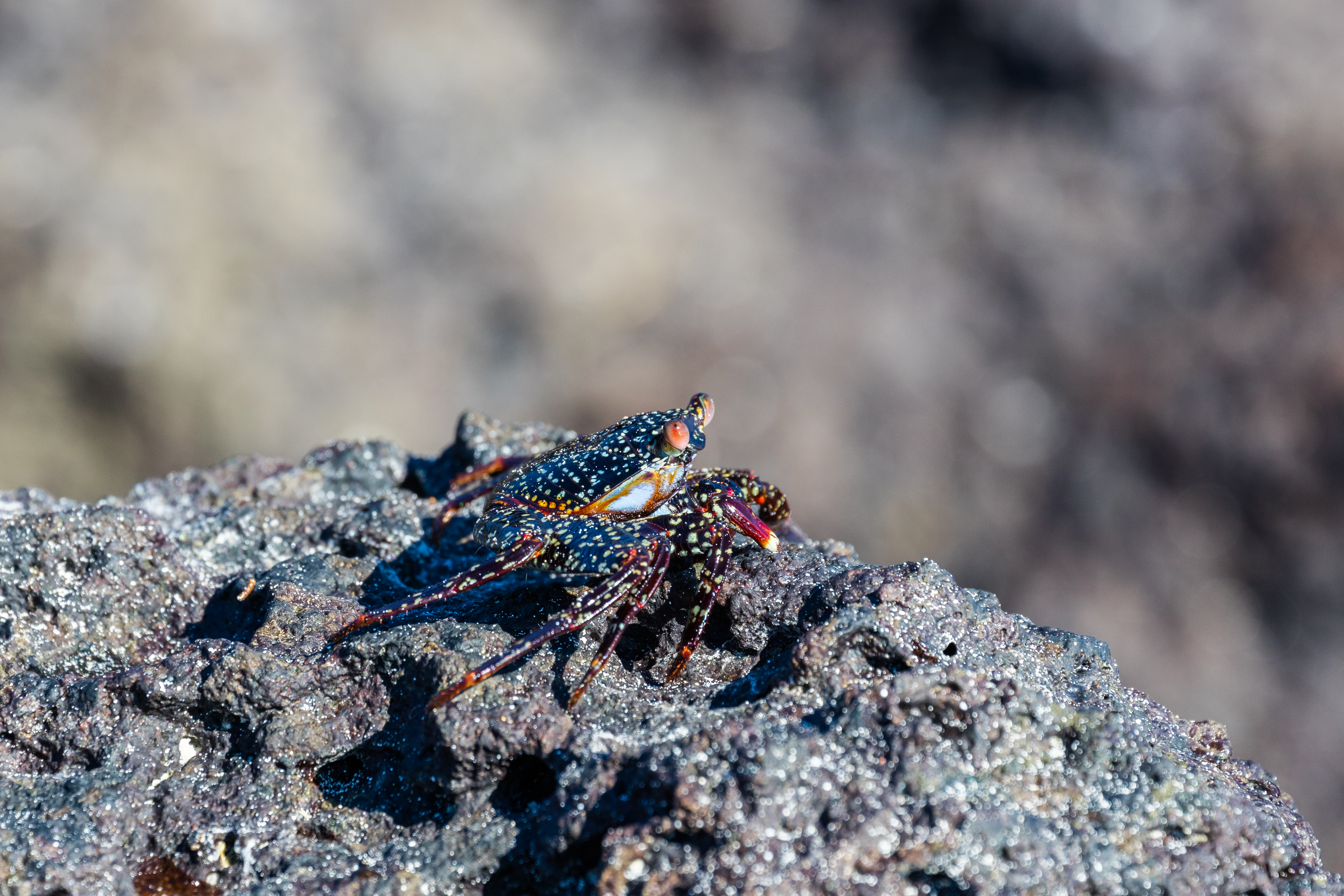
Juvenile in San Cristobal, Galápagos.

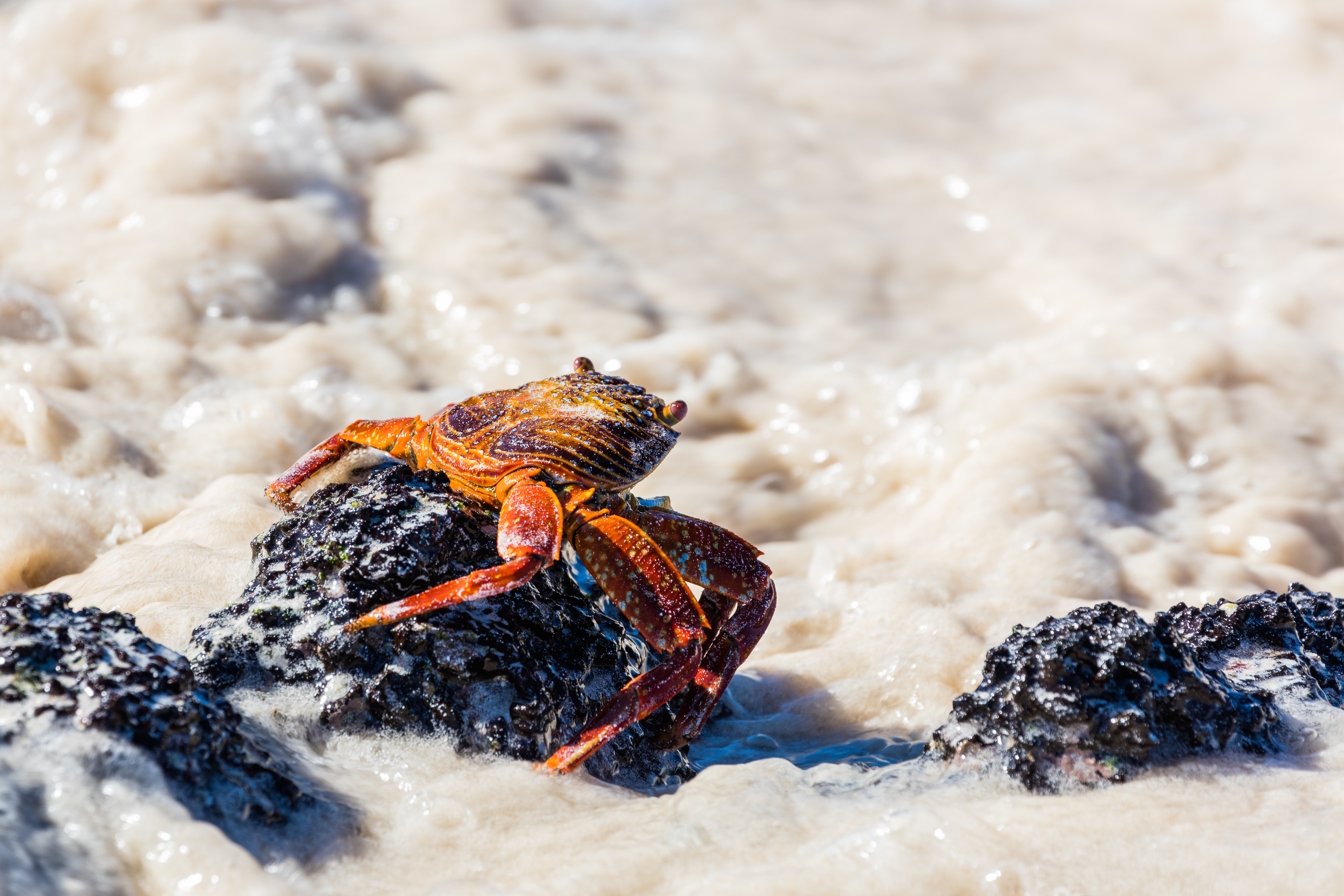
Adult in San Cristobal, Galápagos.

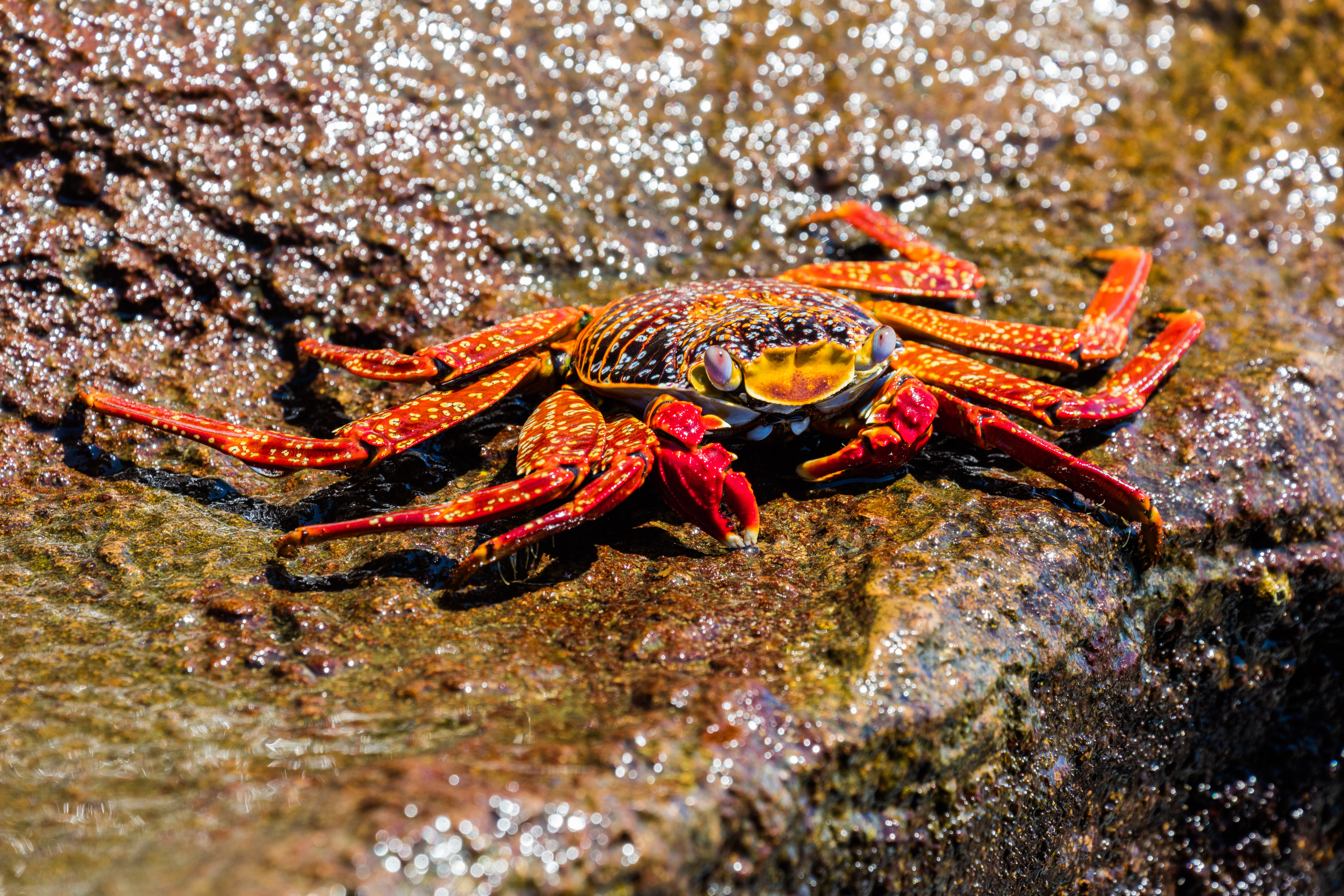
Adult in Punta Pitt (San Cristobal), Galápagos.

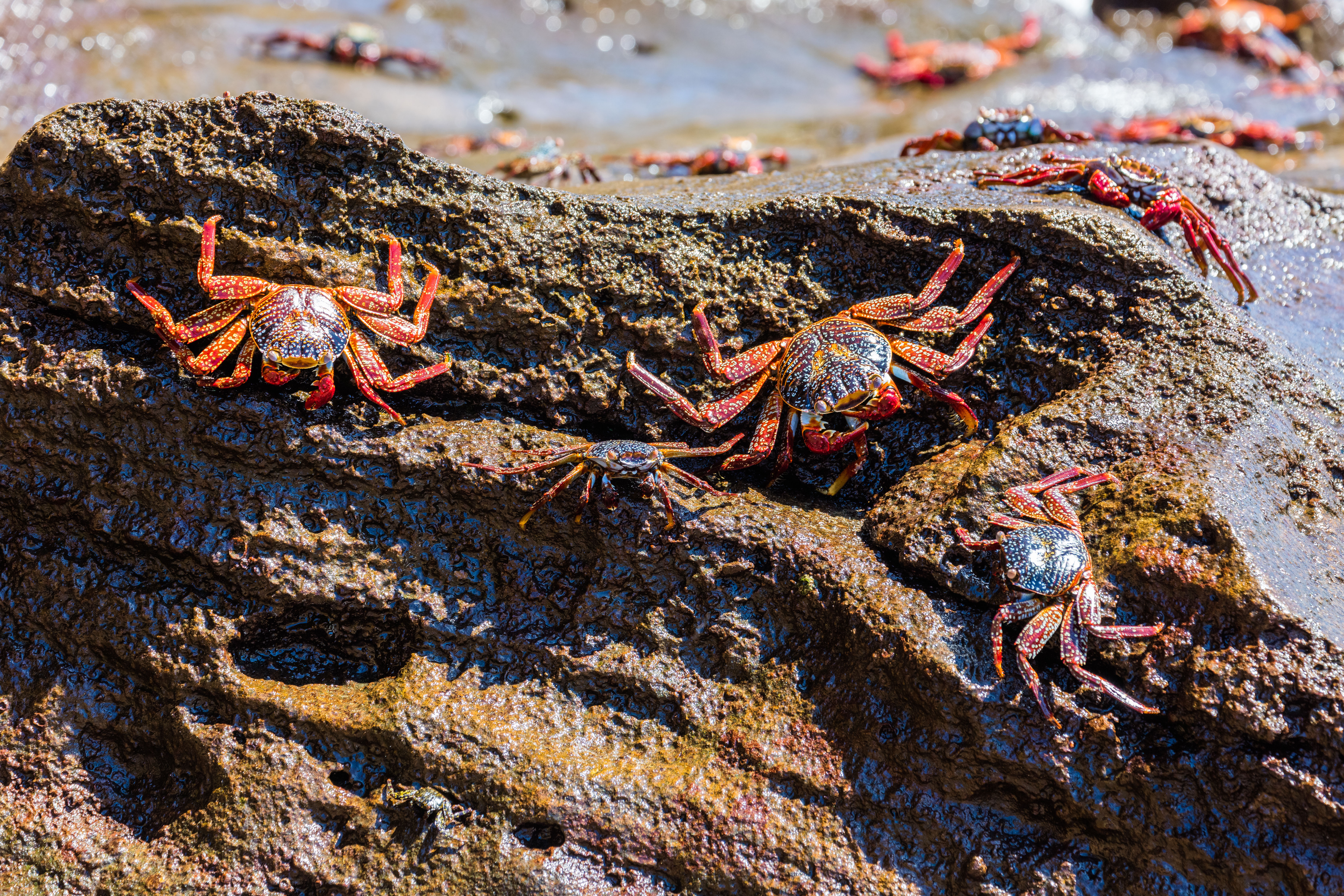
Group in San Cristobal, Galápagos.

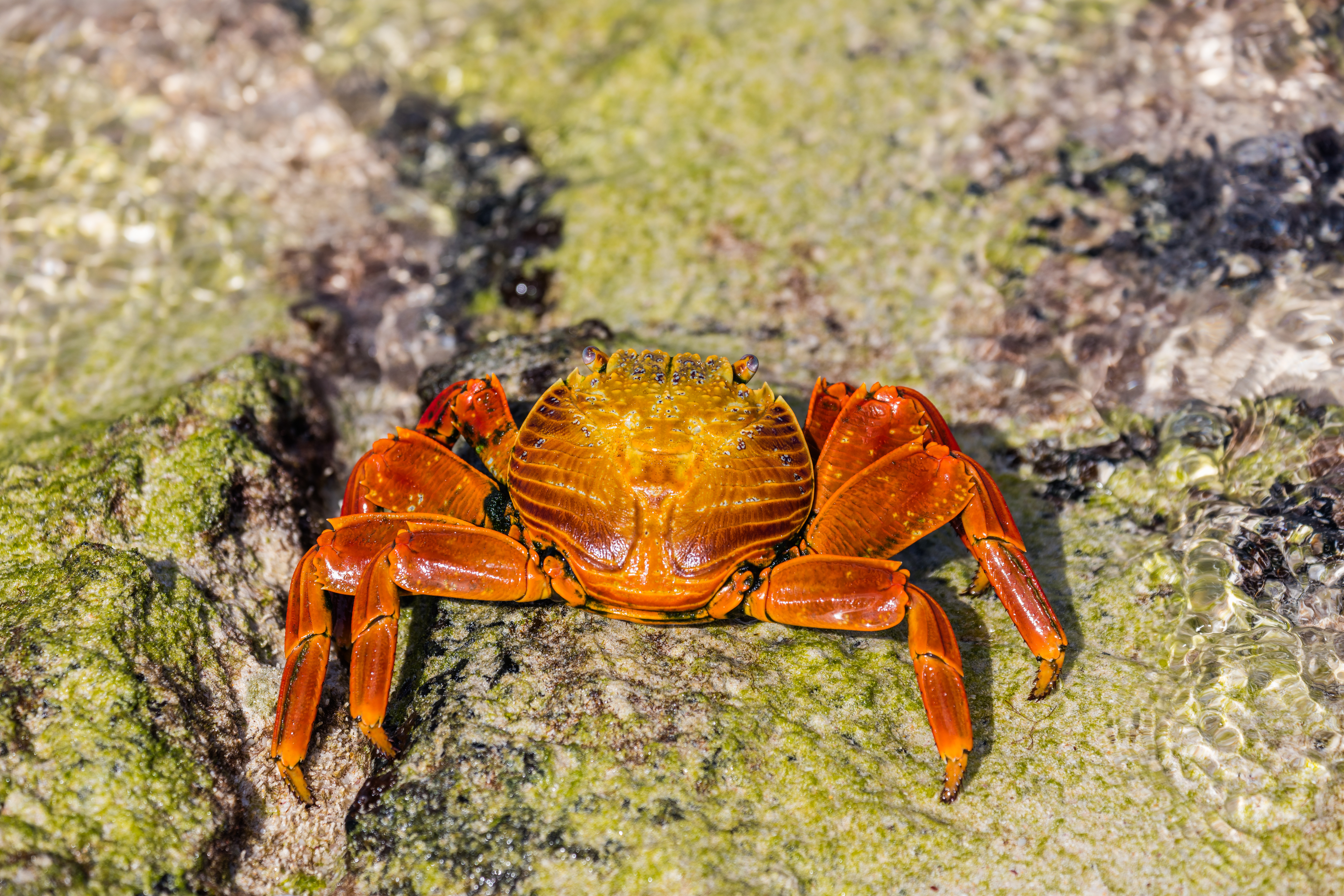
Adult in Baltra, Galápagos.

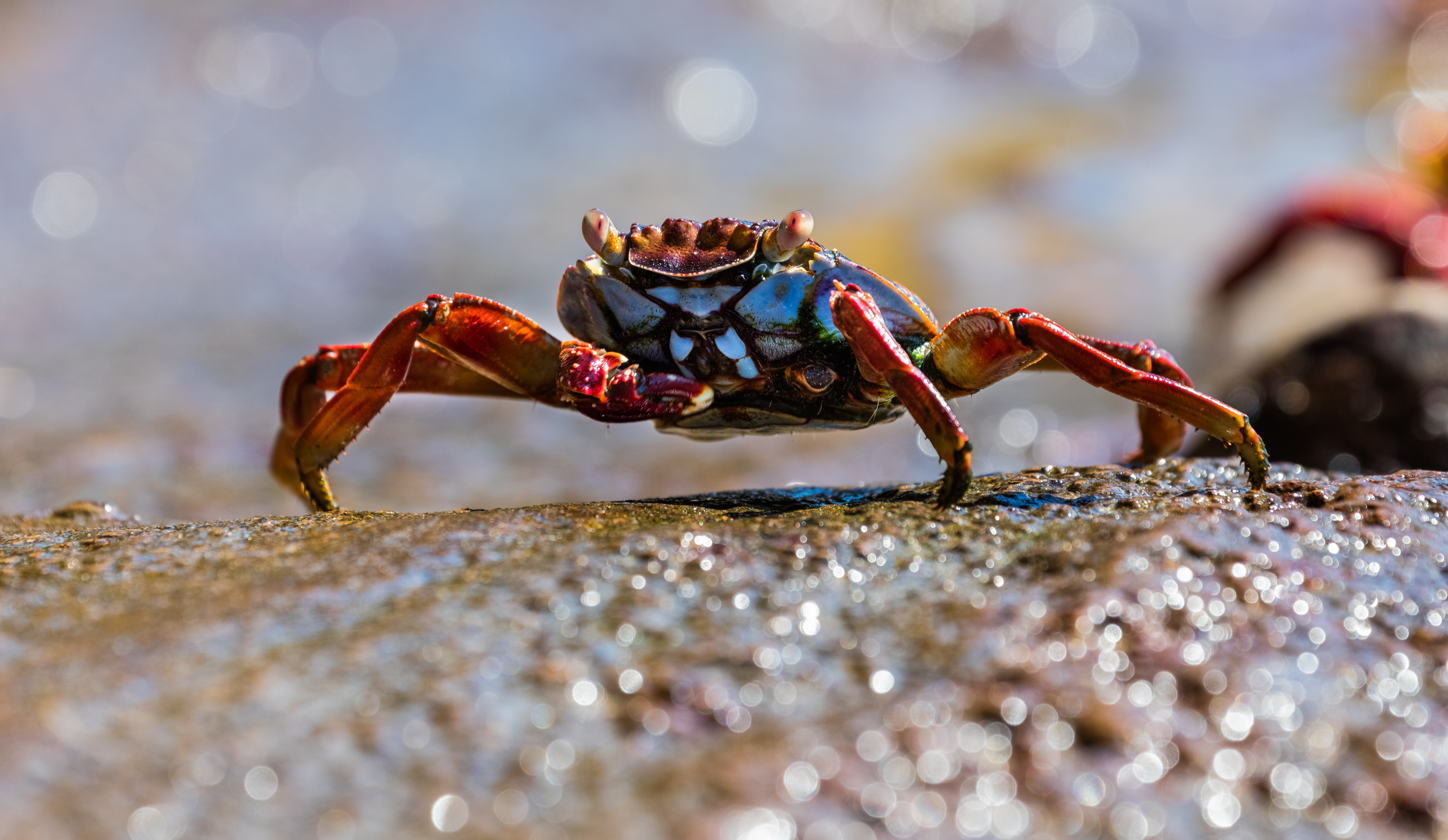
View of the lower part

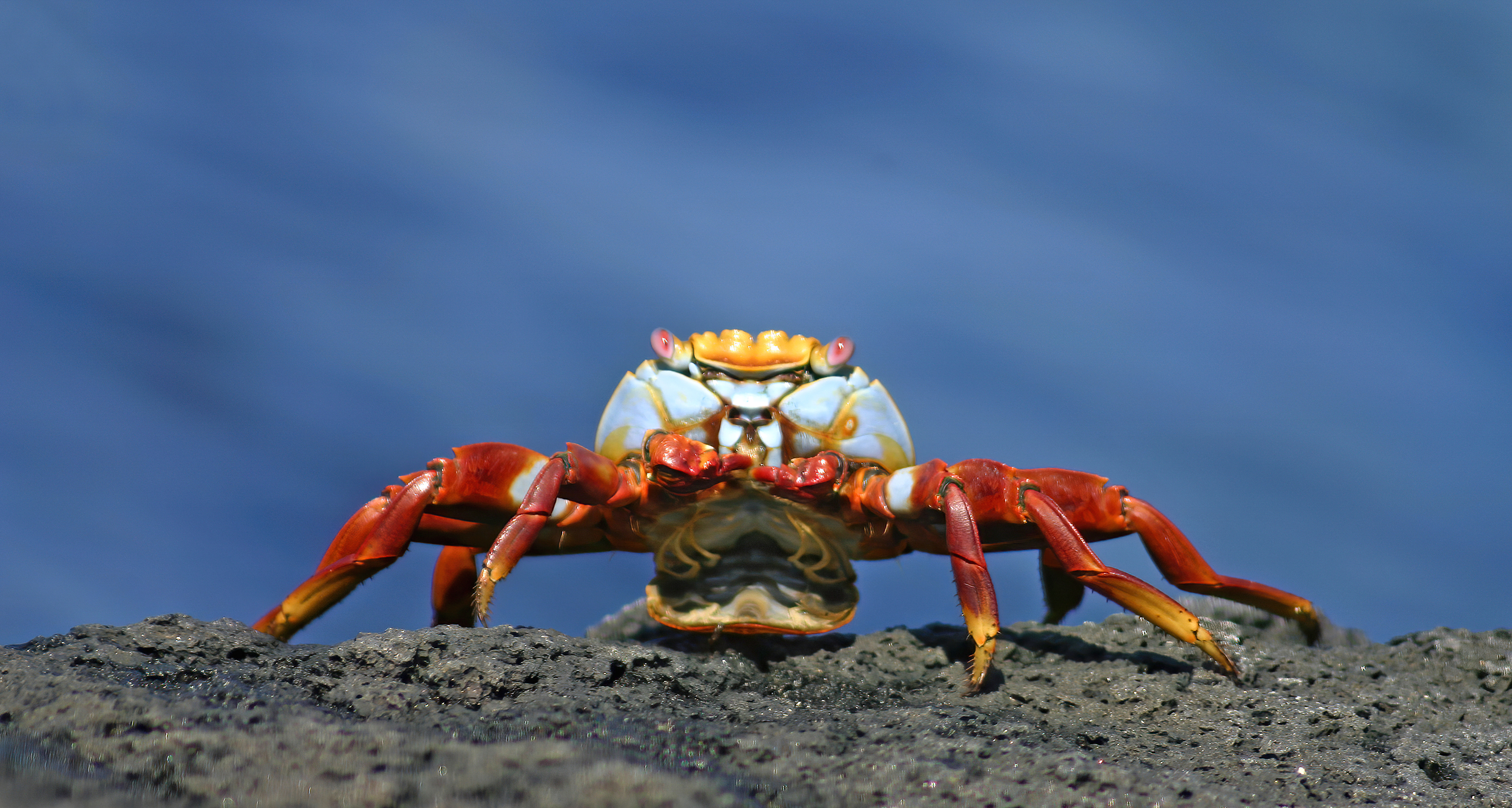
Adult from the front
