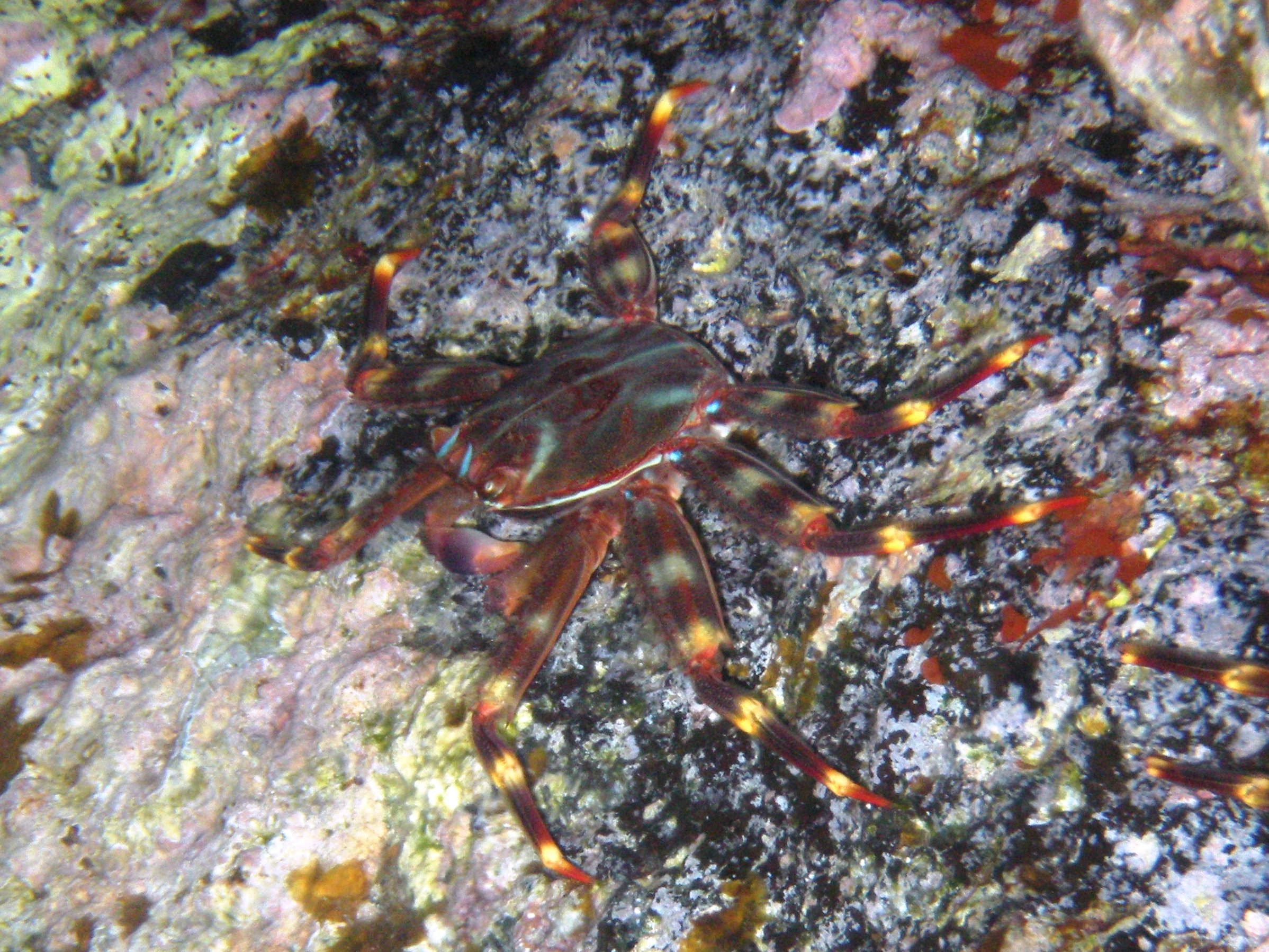
- Percnon gibbesi

Scientific classification
- Kingdom: Animalia
- Phylum: Arthropoda
- Class: Malacostraca
- Order: Decapoda
- Suborder: Pleocyemata
- Infraorder: Brachyura
- Superfamily: Grapsoidea
- Family: Percnidae; Števčić, 2005

= Percnidae =

Family of crustaceans

Percnidae is a family of crabs in the superfamily Grapsoidea. Percnidae contains about six described species in one genus: Percnon (Gistel, 1848).
