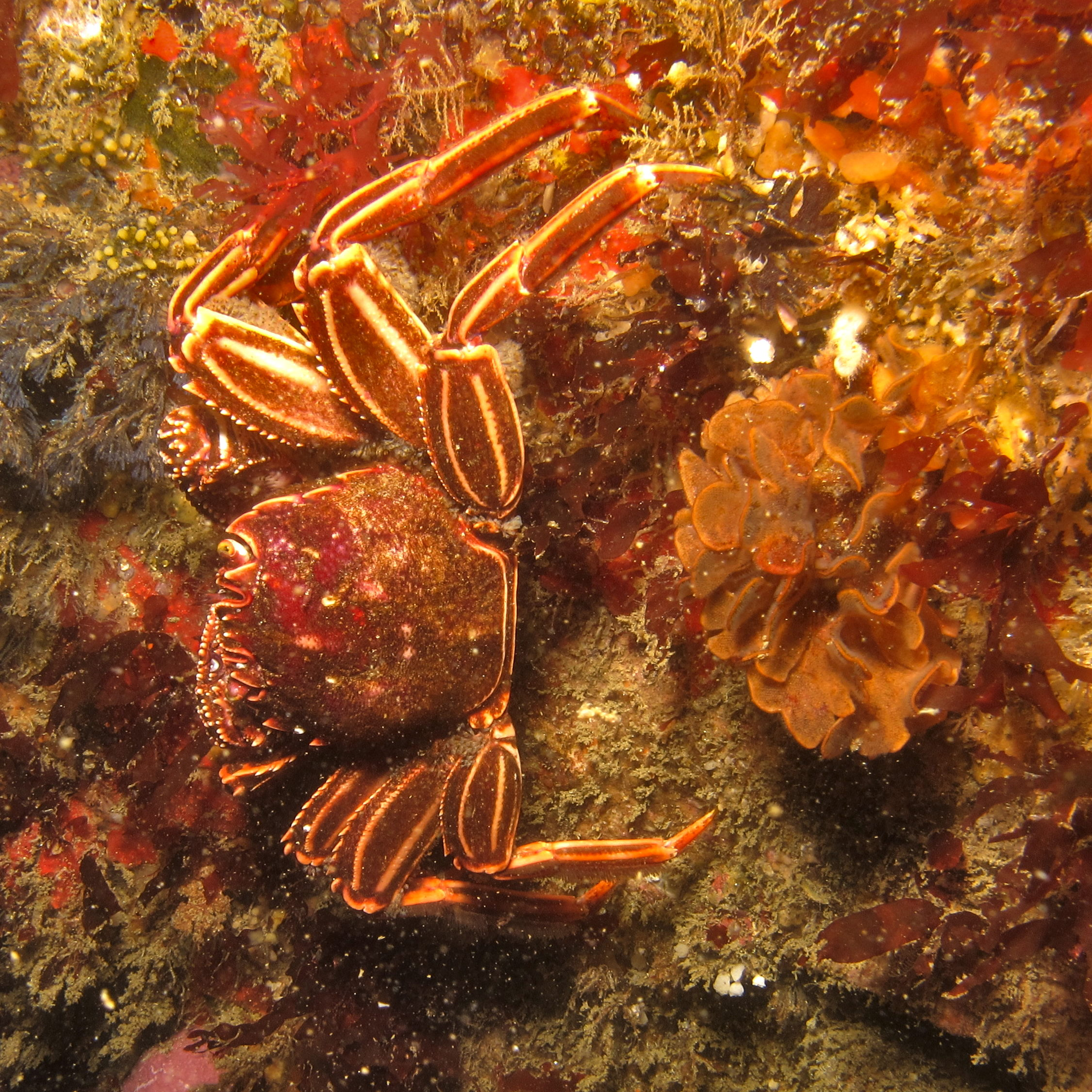
- Guinusia chabrus

Scientific classification
- Kingdom: Animalia
- Phylum: Arthropoda
- Clade: Pancrustacea
- Class: Malacostraca
- Order: Decapoda
- Suborder: Pleocyemata
- Infraorder: Brachyura
- Superfamily: Grapsoidea
- Family: Plagusiidae; Dana, 1851

Genera
- See text

= Plagusiidae =

Family of crabs

The Plagusiidae are a family of crabs, formerly treated as a subfamily of the family Grapsidae, but have since been considered sufficiently distinct to be a family in their own right. The family Plagusiidae used to include a subfamily Plagusiinae, comprising the genera Percnon and Plagusia, which constitute a widespread group of litophilic, intertidal and subtidal crabs that are notorious for their speed and their agility.

Six genera are currently included in the family:

- Caligoplagusia Fujita & Narusa, 2014
- Davusia Guinot, 2007
- Euchirograpsus H. Milne-Edwards, 1853
- Guinusia Schubart & Cuesta, 2010
- Miersiograpsus Türkay, 1978
- Plagusia Latreille, 1804
