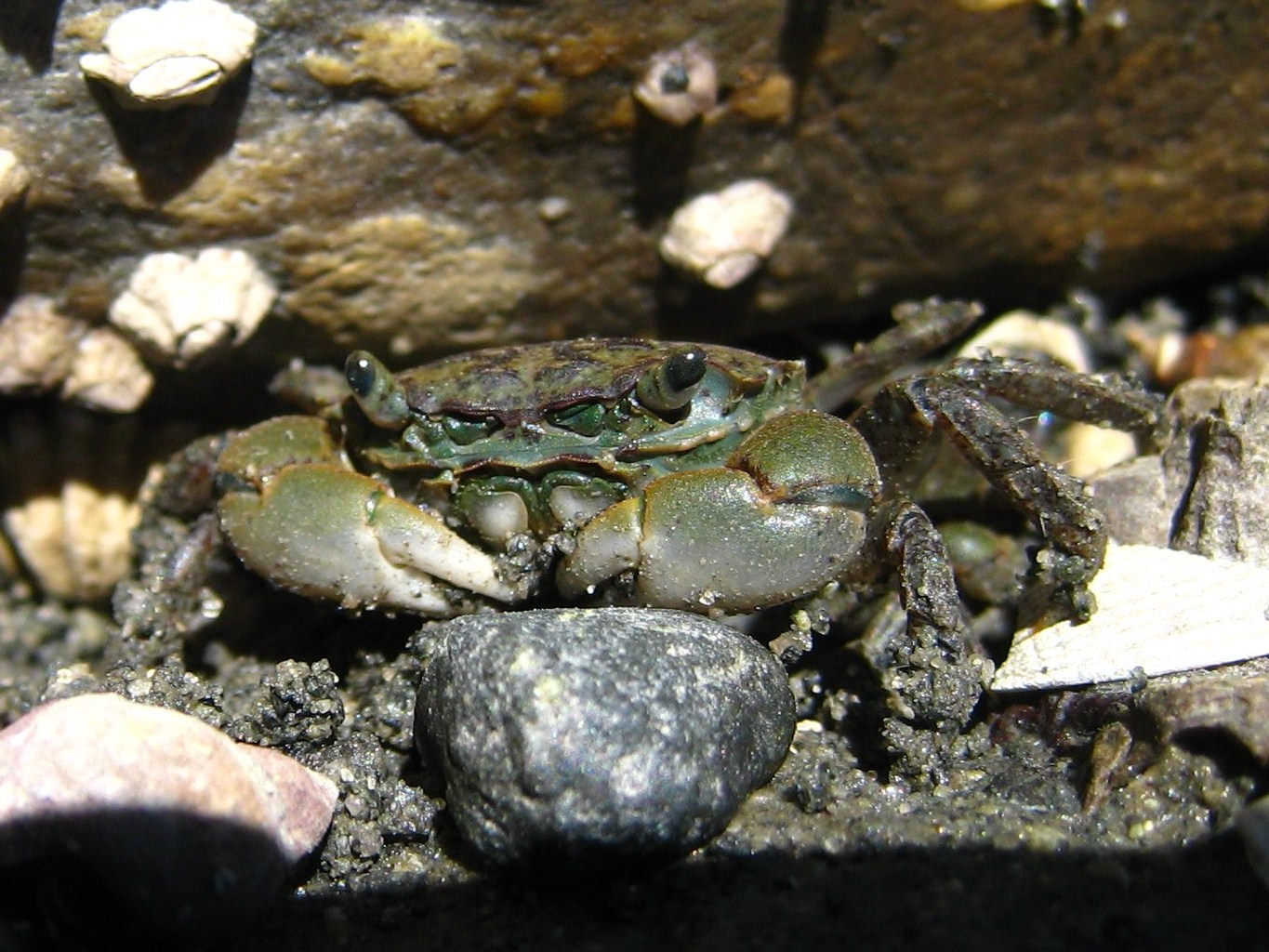

Scientific classification
- Domain: Eukaryota
- Kingdom: Animalia
- Phylum: Arthropoda
- Class: Malacostraca
- Order: Decapoda
- Suborder: Pleocyemata
- Infraorder: Brachyura
- Family: Varunidae
- Genus: Hemigrapsus
- Species: H. oregonensis

Binomial name
- Hemigrapsus oregonensis (Dana, 1851)

Synonyms
- Pseudograpsus oregonensis Dana, 1851

= Hemigrapsus oregonensis =

Species of crab

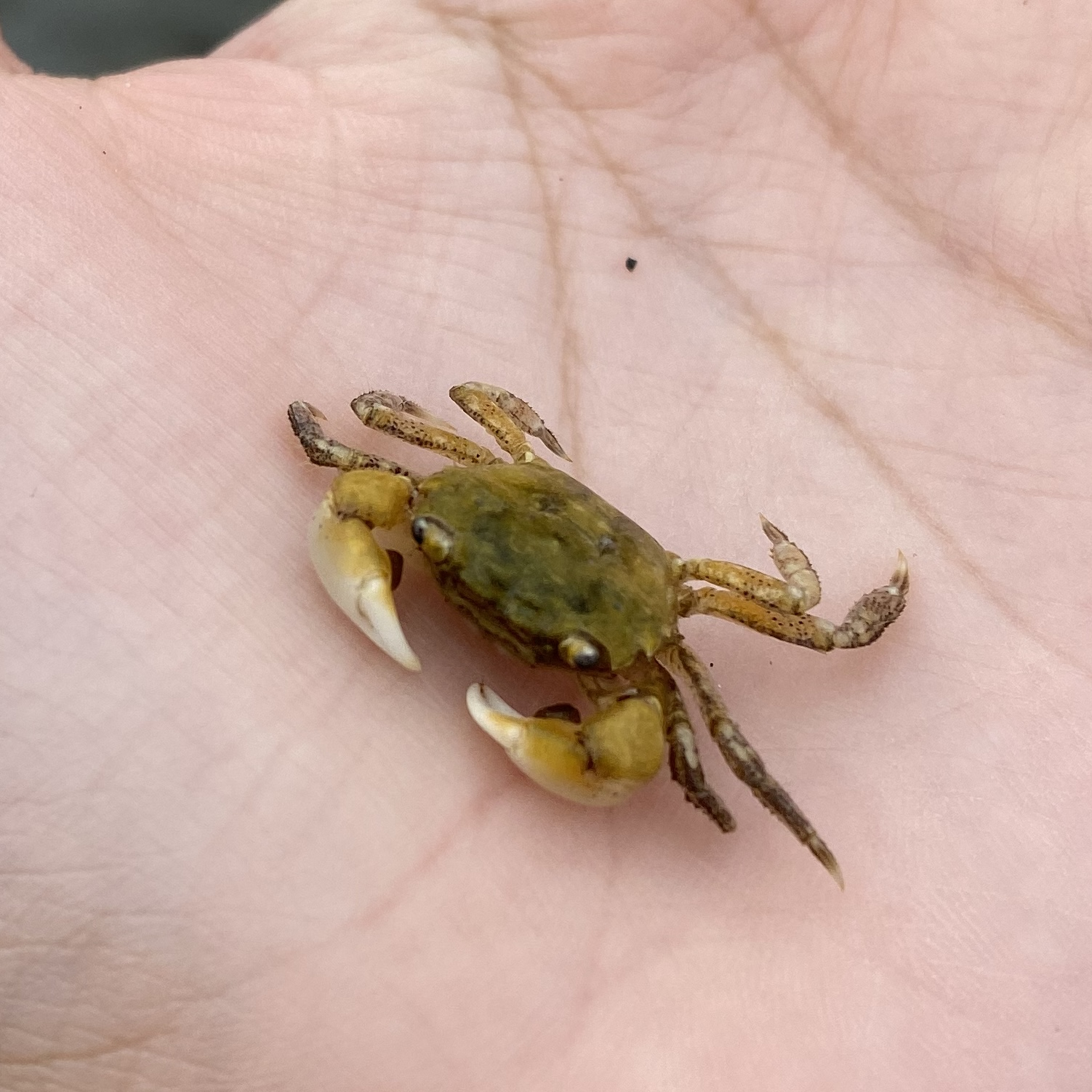
H. oregonensis found on the coast of Parksville, BC

Hemigrapsus oregonensis is a small shore crab of the family Varunidae; formerly classified under the family Grapsidae. It is known under several common names, including yellow shore crab, hairy shore crab, green shore crab, mud-flat crab, bay shore crab and Oregon shore crab. Despite its common name, the crab actually has a wide variety of coloration. It is found along the West Coast of the United States and Canada, specifically along shorelines and similar geographical areas. In 2009, H. oregonensis was included on a list of animals petitioning for the endangered species label, but there was not enough scientific information available for it to be considered as such, so it remains unevaluated to the present day.

== Description ==
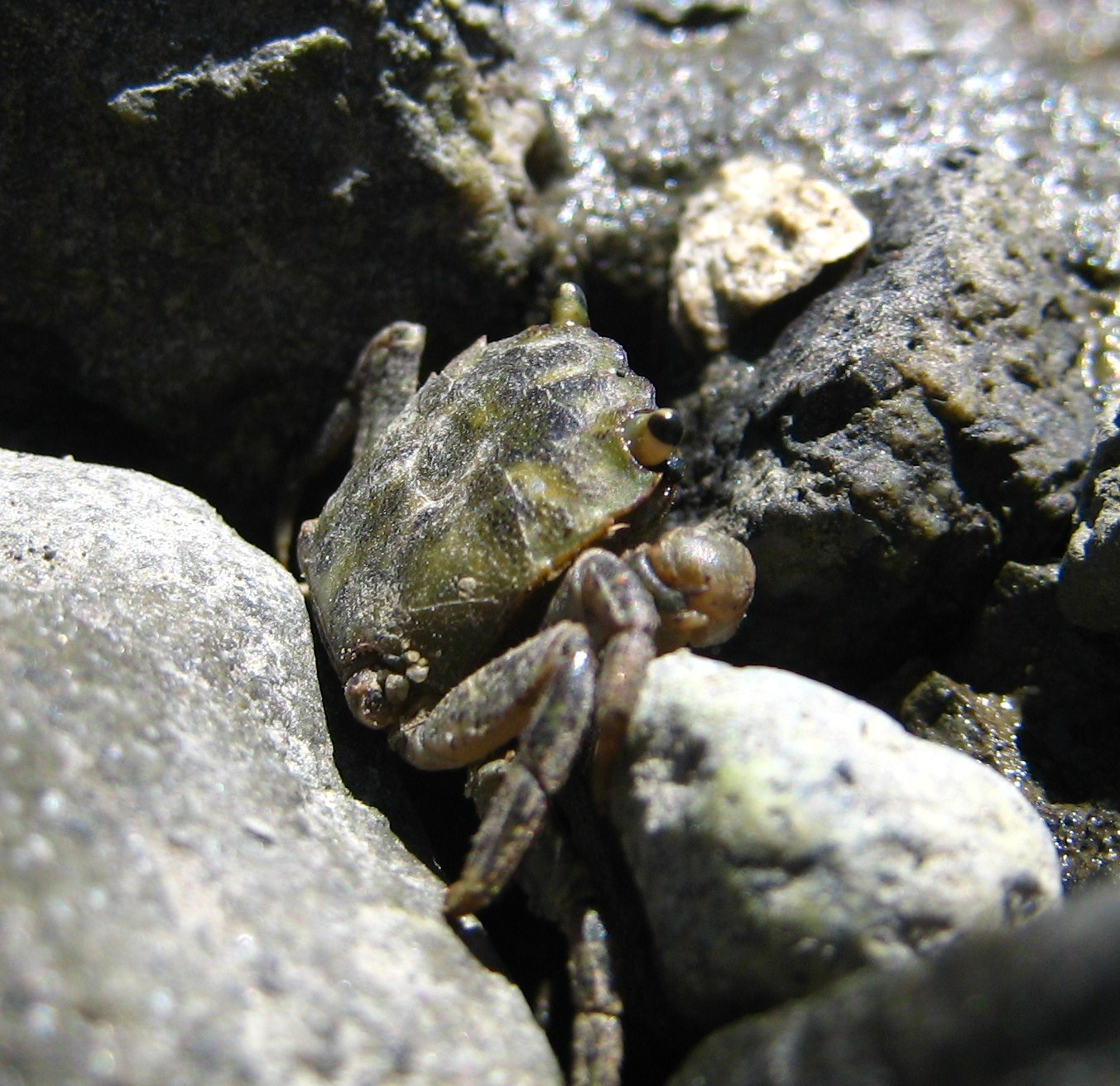
Hemigrapsus oregonensis, on Orcas Island, Washington

This crab is an intertidal crab with wide-set eyes and no rostrum. Despite its name, body color can vary. Often, the crab's rectangular-shaped carapace is deep red or brown with light green spots, but it can also be grey-green, yellow-green, pale green or white with small blue/black spots, as well as have lighter colored legs with similar spots. The carapace in the hind region is free from transverse ridges, but contains three teeth between the orbit and lateral angle. The carapace typically measures 29.1 mm wide for female crabs and 34.7 mm wide for male crabs. Males and females can also be distinguished by the shape of their abdomens; females have more of an oval shape while males have a slightly pointed shape. The legs are covered in setae, and the legs with claws (chelipeds) are tipped with white or yellow with no purple spots. The merus on the hind legs are unflattened.

== Habitat, distribution, and diet ==
The entire genus is restricted to the Pacific Ocean, except for Hemigrapsus affinis which lives along the Atlantic coasts of South America, from Cape San Roque (Rio Grande do Norte state, Brazil) to the Gulf of San Matías (Patagonia, Argentina), and population of Hemigrapsus sanguineus which have been introduced from the species' native range in East Asia to the Atlantic coast of the United States from Portland, Maine to North Carolina, and to the English Channel and North Sea.

This species typically lives under rocks in intertidal zones, but can also be found along shorelines, and in mud flats, algal mats, eelgrass beds and the tidal mouths of large rivers (estuaries). It prefers areas with diverse plant matter, fine sediment and slow, protected currents. Its geographical range in the United States spans from Resurrection Bay to Bahía de Todos Santos. It is heavily concentrated in the San Francisco Bay, along the coasts of Oregon and Washington, and along the west coast of Canada, specifically in coastal British Columbia and on Vancouver Island.

Hemigrapsus oregonensis's diet primarily consists of diatoms and green algae, but it will occasionally eat meat, if accessible. It is a scavenger, and it will prey on small invertebrates or use its maxillepeds to filter-feed. It is preyed on by shorebirds, a red ribbon worm which targets its eggs, and the European green crab, Carcinus maenas, a non-indigenous littoral crab which has been classified as one of the world's worst invasive species.

=== Estelline Salt Spring ===
In 1962, Gordon C. Creel described a population of crabs in the Estelline Salt Springs, describing and naming them as Hemigrapsus estellinensis in 1964. The spring where it lived were contained by the United States Army Corps of Engineers. It differed from its relatives by the pattern of spots on its back, and by the relative sizes of its limbs, but genetic analysis in 2020 confirmed H. estellinensis as a junior synonym of H. orogenensis.

Hemigrapsus estellinensis was described as having a rectangular carapace with almost parallel sides. Males have a carapace length of up to 18.5 millimetres (0.73 in) and a carapace width of up to 22 mm (0.87 in), while females have a carapace up to 17 mm (0.67 in) long and 22 mm (0.87 in) wide. The front corners of the carapace are developed into three strong teeth on each side. The chief difference between H. estellinensis and other species in the genus is the extensive pattern of rust-red spots on the animal's "drab green" carapace. H. estellinensis also has a pair of conspicuous white spots near the ends of the H–shaped indentation on the animal's back, and another spot between each of those spots and the lateral margin of the carapace. The legs are marked with larger spots than the carapace, and both the chelipeds and the walking legs are shorter than in other species. There are no spots on the animal's underside, including the abdomen. In males, the chelipeds bear a hairy patch containing chemoreceptors on the ventral side of the claw. Creel collected 6 males and ten females; one of the males is the holotype and all the others are paratypes. All sixteen are held in the National Museum of Natural History as specimens USNM 107855 and USNM 107856. A few living specimens were taken to Wayland College (now Wayland Baptist University), but died within 17 hours for unknown reasons. Two of the females laid eggs before dying, one laying 3,000 and the other 8,000.

H. estellinensis lived in Estelline Salt Springs east of the town of Estelline in Hall County, Texas, 800 kilometres (500 mi) from the nearest ocean. Before its extinction, it was the only troglobitic crab in the contiguous United States. Its occurrence so far from the ocean has been described as "curious", and the species was "probably a Pleistocene relic".

The springs originally produced water with a salinity of 43‰ that fed the Prairie Dog Town Fork of the Red River. The salinity derives from Permian red beds, and has a strong structuring effect on the Red River's biota. It had a flow of approximately 11,000 litres (3,000 US gal) per minute, and the pool was 20 m (65 ft) wide at the surface, which was at an altitude of 531.1 metres (1,742.5 ft) above sea level. At a depth of 8 m (25 ft), it was only 6 m (20 ft) wide, and then widened slightly down to a depth of 37 m (120 ft). Below that, an opening 0.9 m (3 ft) wide led into a cavern completely filled with water.

The United States Army Corps of Engineers built a dike around the Estelline Salt Springs in January 1964, which has reduced the chloride load on the Red River by 220 tonnes (240 short tons) per day. Before it was contained, the spring had a rich biota, comprising the cyanobacteria Oscillatoria and Lyngbya, the green algae Ulva clathrata and U. intestinalis, twenty species of diatom, many invertebrates – including a species of barnacle – and a single fish species, Cyprinodon rubrofluviatilis. The springs have since increased in salinity, and many species have been driven to extinction, including H. estellinensis and the undescribed barnacle. As early as December 1962, attempts to find further living individuals of H. estellinensis were unsuccessful, and it was probably extinct before Creel's description was published in 1964.

== Biology and behavior ==
Hemigrapsus oregonensis is a strong osmoregulator, and can endure hypoxic zones far better than most other shore crabs. Its tolerance is highest in conditions of low salinity and turbid estuaries, which is why it can be found largely in brackish bays. It is a good digger and prefers to stay hidden in burrows it has dug during the day, only coming out to feed at night. While it can be spotted under debris in mudflats and under rocks, it will burrow towards safety once uncovered. H. oregonensis may also house a parasitic isopod known as Portunion conformis in its perivisceral cavity, but this is not apparent through observation with the naked eye.

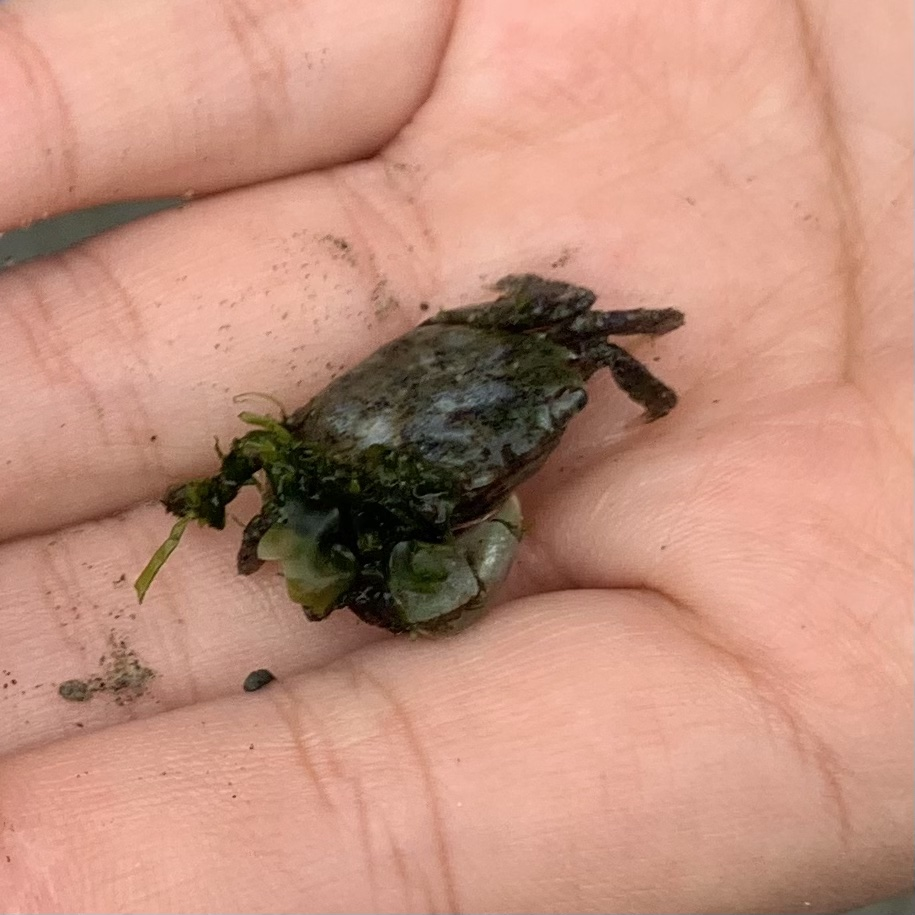
Single-clawed H. oregonensis with algae growing from carapace and limbs found in Parksville, BC

== Reproduction ==
Hemigrapsus oregonensis has the highest rate of breeding during March, and the least during October. From February to July, female crabs will carry eggs, and from May to July, hatching occurs. On some rare occasions, a second breeding period will begin in August and hatch in September. Female crabs can carry anywhere from 100 to 11,000 eggs per ovulation season, and once fertilized, the eggs will go through a pre-zoeal stage while unhatched. In the next five post-hatching zoeal stages, the eggs develop into planktonic larvae, and after about 8-13 weeks they will metamorphose to become full-grown adults. The timeline of this transition from egg to adult depends on salinity and water temperature, as well as the amount and quality of food available. These factors can also impact the population size.

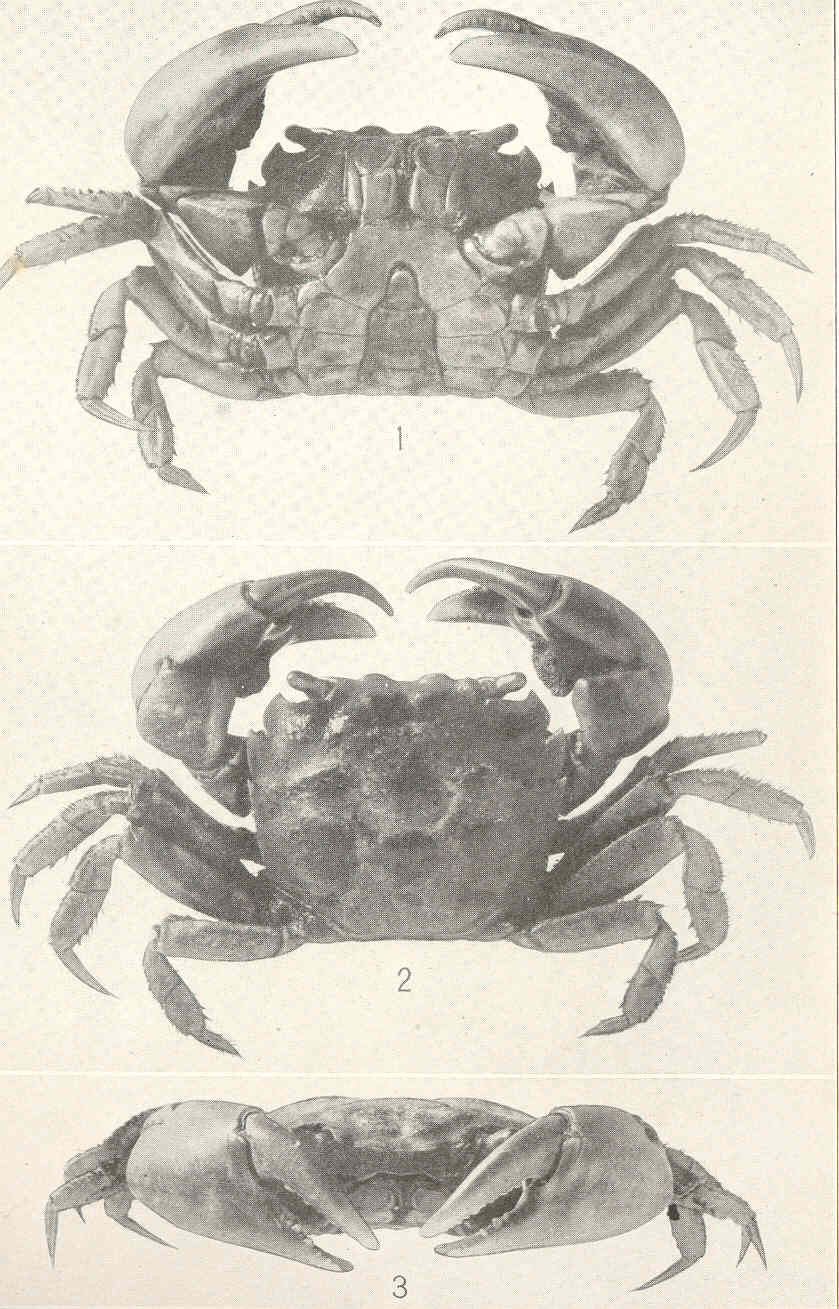
H. oregonensis anatomy diagram

== Related species ==
Hemigrapsus oregonensis is often mistaken for two similar species of crab; Pachygrapsus crassipes and Hemigrapsus nudus. However, P. crassipes can be distinguished by the transverse ridges located on its carapce, and its two teeth between the orbit and lateral angle, as opposed to H. oregonensis's three. The adult H. oregonensis is also smaller (3.0–3.5 cm or 1.2–1.4 in) than the purple shore crab, H. nudus. H. nudus can also be distinguished by the lack of setae on its legs, and the purple spots on its chelipeds. However, color is an unreliable method for identification of species, considering both H. nudus and H. oregonensis are commonly found in shades of green as opposed to their descriptor colors, purple and yellow. H. oregonensis and H. nudus are the only hemigrapsus species found along the Pacific West Coast of North America.
