= Asian shore crab =

The name Asian shore crab may refer to either of two species of crab:

- Hemigrapsus sanguineus
- Hemigrapsus takanoi
