= Purple rock crab =

Purple rock crab is a common name which may apply to any of the following crab species:

- Leptograpsus variegatus
- Hemigrapsus sexdentatus
