= Purple shore crab =

Scientific classification
- Kingdom: Animalia
- Phylum: Arthropoda
- Clade: Pancrustacea
- Class: Malacostraca
- Order: Decapoda
- Suborder: Pleocyemata
- Infraorder: Brachyura
- Family: Varunidae
- Genus: Hemigrapsus
- Species: H. nudus

Binomial name
- Hemigrapsus nudus (Dana, 1851)

Synonyms
- Grapsus marmoratus White, 1847; Pseudograpsus nudus Dana, 1851; Heterograpsus nudus (Dana, 1851); Heterograpsus marmoratus Milne-Edwards, 1853; Brachynotus nudus

Species of crab

The purple shore crab (Hemigrapsus nudus or the naked shore crab) is a common crab of the family Varunidae that is indigenous to the west coast of United States, Canada, and Mexico. H. nudus was first described in 1847 by Adam White, and in 1851, James Dwight Dana formally classified the species. H. nudus is a small, amphibious crab that is similar physically and behaviorally to Pachygrapsus crassipes and Hemigrapsus oregonensis. The purple shore crab is generally a dark purple color with olive green, red, and white spots. Mating season for H. nudus begins in mid-winter and larval crabs undergo 5 zoeal stages and a juvenile stage. Adult crabs mainly feed on algae but will occasionally scavenge other animals. H. nudus prefers inter-tidal and sub-tidal zones, and it can oftentimes be found sheltering under rocks or other debris. H. nudus demonstrates complex compensatory mechanisms to counteract fluctuating salinity and water oxygen concentrations, permitting it to live in a variety of different environments.

== Taxonomy and discovery ==
Hemigrapsus nudus is a true crab within the Hemigrapsus genus and Varunidae family. The first documentation of H. nudus occurred in 1847 when zoologist Adam White described the species as Grapsus marmoratus, a name that was not accepted taxonomically and declared a nomen nudum. The purple shore crab was properly classified by James Dwight Dana in 1851. Dana originally described the species as Pseudograpsus nudus, with Hemigrapsus being used as the parent species. Dana also described similar specimens as Heterograpsus nudus, with this name later being classified as synonymous. In 1853, H. Milne Edwards independently described the species as Heterograpsus marmoratus, a name that is not considered taxonomically valid. Another synonym for H. nudus is Brachynotus nudus.

== Description ==
The body of the purple shore crab is divided into two major components, the cephalothorax and the abdomen. A small crab, H. nudus reaches sizes of approximately 4.0–5.6 centimetres (1.6–2.2 in) in width and approximately 4.8 centimetres (1.9 in) in length. Beneath the thorax, there are five pairs of thoracic appendages and three pairs of maxillipeds that fold ventrally. The eyestalks are angled outwardly. The mouth is compositely made of six pairs of appendages, which include one pair of mandibles located on either side of the mouth. Additionally, it is made up of two pairs of maxillae and three pairs of maxillipeds that attach posteriorly to the mouth and cover the mandibles.

The dorsal shell (carapace) is flat, smooth, and has a square-like shape. The antero-lateral margins are rounded and the carapace lacks transverse lines. Its carapace is generally a dark purple in color, although it may be olive green or red, with white or cream markings. The color of the legs matches the color of the carapace but the white-tipped claws (chelipeds) are a lighter color with purple or red spots – these spots allow H. nudus to be distinguished from a similar looking crab, the lined shore crab, Pachygrapsus crassipes, whose chelipeds lack spots. Furthermore, the purple shore crab is generally less aggressive and slower moving compared to the genus Pachygrapsus. While uncommon, fully white and yellow coloration has also been noted in some specimens, which has been observed throughout the Hemigrapsus genus. The chelipeds are smooth, equal in size, and are curved inward. The legs of H. nudus lack setae, a distinguishing feature of the otherwise similar H. oregonensis and P. crassipes.

Hemigrapsus nudus displays sexual dimorphism and females are generally smaller than the males. Male carapaces can grow to a width of 2.2 inches (5.6 cm) while females grow to a smaller 1.3 inches (3.3 cm). The male abdomen is narrow and triangular, with an exposed sternum. The females' abdomen is wide and flap-like, which fully covers the sternum. The center of the chelipods on males is covered in a patch of fine, long hair while this hair is largely absent in females.

== Life cycle ==
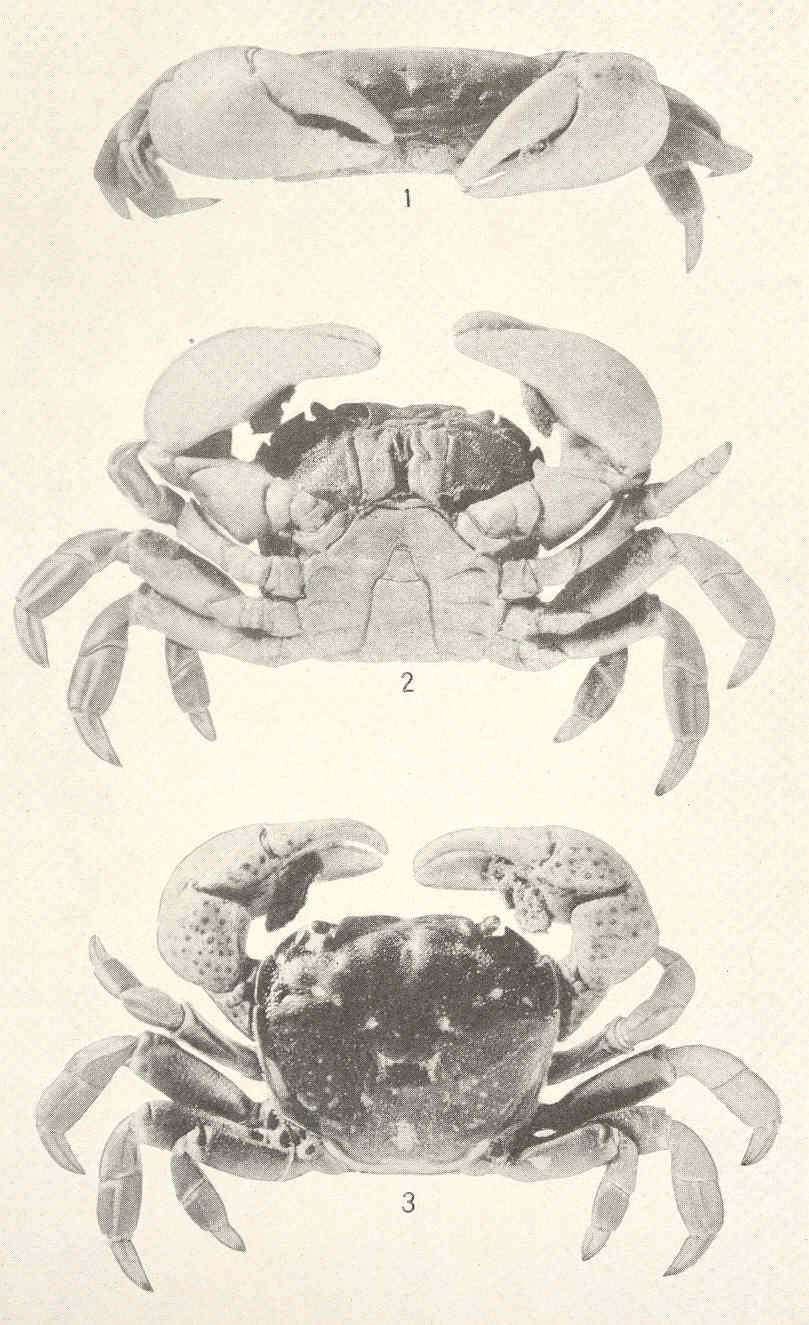
Front, bottom, and top views of the Purple Shore Crab

Hemigrapsus nudus begins mating between December and January. The mating process is considered very similar to pachygrapsus species, save for that pachygrapsus breed in the summer and not the winter. Mating occurs when a male holds the female by her chelipeds, and guides her via his walking legs. The male will use his swimming legs (first pleopods) to move his sperm to the female. Females become gravid (egg bearing) during January to mid-July, most commonly in April. Samples taken from Puget Sound, Washington have shown that roughly 70% of females are carrying fertilized eggs by late January and 99% are gravid by April. Females lay between 400 and 36,000 eggs annually, and second broods are rarely observed. Embyo crabs begin at a size of 380 μm and grow to 450 μm prior to hatching. Hatching typically occurs between May and July, but is highly dependent on water temperature. Broods in Monterey Bay, California, have been observed hatching between October and May; broods in British Columbia, Canada, hatch between April and May; and Friday Harbor, Washington, broods hatch in July. After hatching, the crabs proceed through 5 zoeal stages and one magalopa (post larval) stage prior to achieving juvenile stage.

Larval H. nudus in the first zoeal stage have lateral projections along their second and third abdominal segments. The first stage zoea are planktotrophic with four spines and compound eyes. The rostrum and distal spines are equal length but the two dorsal spines are shorter. The exospine is 1.2 millimetres (0.047 in) in length. The zoea of H. nudus differ from H. oregonensis and P. crassipes in their body and eye size. When transitioning to a successive stage, the zoea will undergo a molt. Juvenile H. nudus presents with a shallow depression along the frontal carapace and the spines are generally rounded. The eyes are larger and the dactyls are short and flat. The abdomens of males and females are identical at this stage.

Following the juvenile stage, growth will continue through molting. Pre-molting involves the epidermis separating from the cuticle. This is also punctuated by an increase in epidermal cell replication. Post-molt crabs have a soft shell that will gradually harden and will also involve the regeneration of previously amputated limbs.

== Ecology ==
=== Diet and predation ===
The purple shore crab primarily feeds on sea lettuce and other green algae, and occasionally scavenges dead animals. Specifically, the purple shore crab feeds on diatoms, desmids, small Ulva, and Enteromorpha algae species. H. nudus most commonly obtains green algae from rocks by scraping it off with their chelae. When scavenging, H. nudus most often eats amphipods, whelks, and the eggs of Nucella emarginata. Littorina scutulata sensu lato are also predated by H. nudus and will employ chemical cues to avoid the crabs. L scutulata is capable of detecting exudate from both the purple shore crab and its prey, warning it that the purple shore crab is actively feeding in the area. The purple shore crab is the prey of seagulls, seabirds, white-winged scoters, anthopleura anemones, larger crabs, staghorn sculpins, and tidepool sculpins. Nucella lamellosa has not been observed predating H. nudus but is attracted to its scent. Portunion conformis will parasitize the perivisceral cavity of the purple shore crab. Like other species of the genera Hemigrapsus and Pachygrapsus, H. nudus' eggs are vulnerable to parasitization by Carcinonemertes epialti.

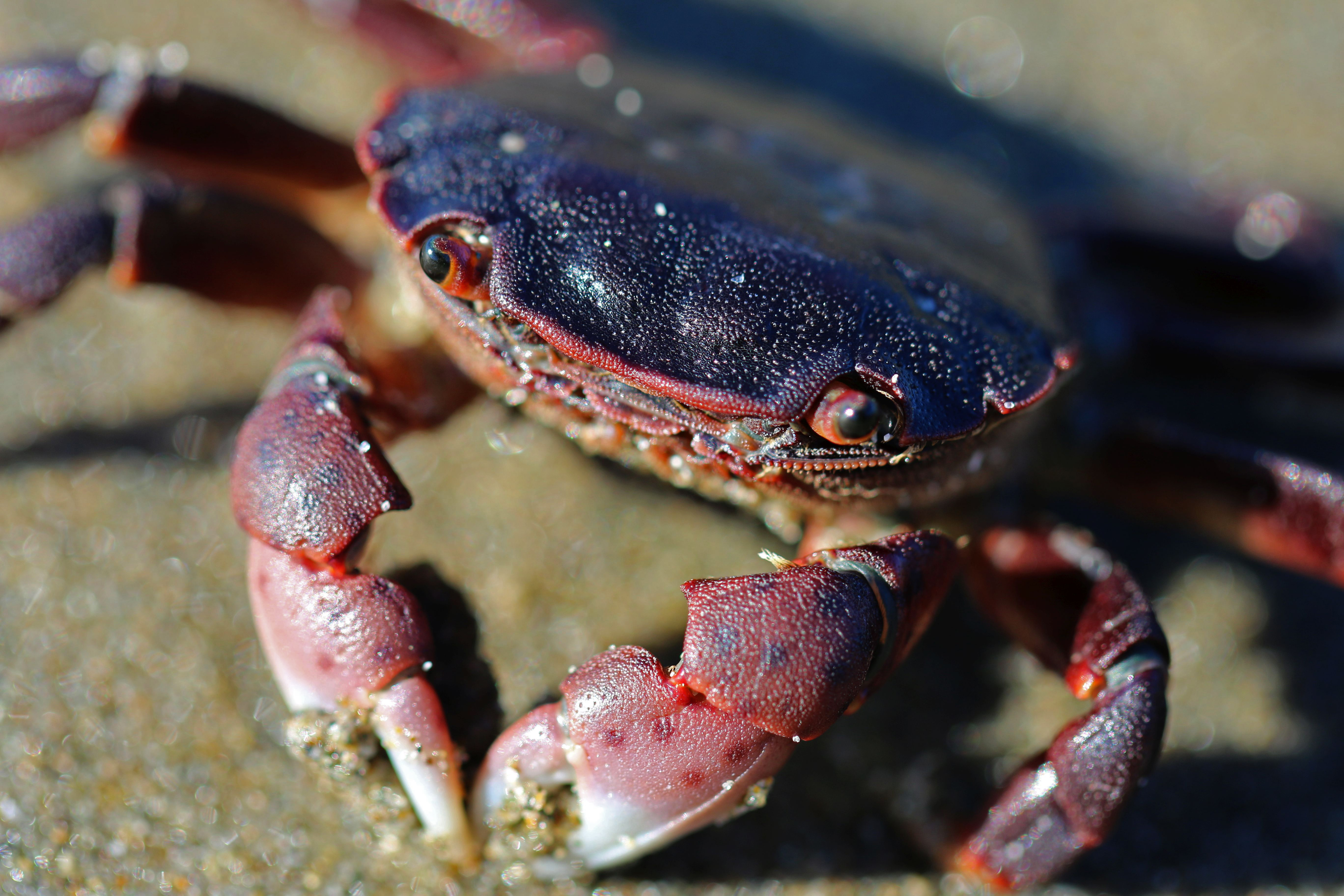
Front facing image of H. nudus

=== Distribution and habitat ===
The purple shore crab is most commonly found sheltering under rocks and in seaweed within the inter-tidal and sub-tidal regions along the western coast of North America. The purple shore crab's distribution ranges from Alaska to Baja California in Mexico but it is uncommon to find the purple shore crab south of Morro Bay, in central California. H. nudus strongly prefers semi-protected and protected rocky coasts and bays, and can commonly be found in tide pools, swift water, and under large boulders. Less commonly, H. nudus can be found under driftwood or in salt marshes. Despite the increase in anthropogenic plastic waste pollution in inter-tidal zones, H. nudus has been shown to generally avoid plastic, glass, and styrofoam shelters when able and instead prefers natural shelters. The crabs have been observed sheltering on acrylic surfaces, however. Unlike other members of the Hemigrapsus genus, the purple shore crab does not live in burrows. H. nudus can tolerate temperatures up to 33.6 °C (92.5 °F) but prefers colder environments. Generally, H. nudus avoids temperatures above 26.9 °C (80.4 °F) and strongly prefers water temperatures of 17 °C (63 °F).

=== Behavior ===
Hemigrapsus nudus is commonly found together with Hemigrapsus oregonensis. Unlike other shore crab species, H. nudus is slow moving and will often play dead. H. nudus is nocturnal. Male and female crabs often display different defense behaviors; males will often fight when disturbed while females will autotomize and flee. Different sexes will also display different autonomy patterns, with both males and females generally missing at least one limb on average. H. nudus engages in behavioral thermoregulation by scuttling in and out of the water.

== Physiology ==
=== Osmoregulation ===
The purple shore crab is an osmoregulator, thus it can tolerate hyper-osmotic and hypo-osmotic environments. H. nudus is more tolerant to salinity changes relative to other Hemigrapsus species and is resistant to desiccation. This allows H. nudus to habitate in seawater, brackish water, and hyper-saline estuarine marshes, with their tolerance to low salinities highly dependent on water temperature. This is achieved by the heavy regulation of Na K-ATPase in the gills. The posterior gills in H. nudus engage in the majority of osmoregulation and will increase their filtration activity as salinity increases.

=== Respiration ===
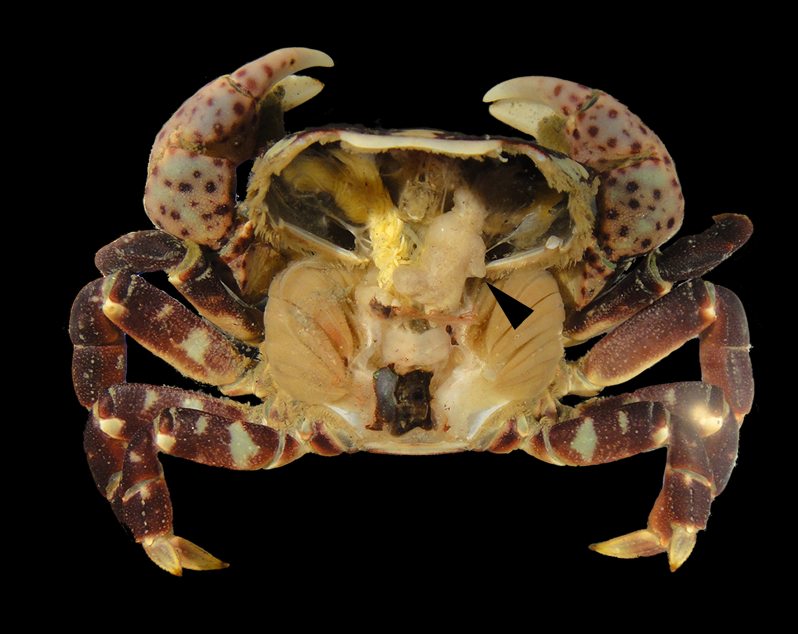
Carapace removed, showing the internal gills of H. nudus

Hemigrapsus nudus is amphibious and capable of surviving in both aquatic and out-of-water environments. H. nudus is capable of staying out of water for up to 8 hours and will engage in hyperventilation prior to exiting the water in an effort to increase hemolymph O_{2} concentrations.

When hypoxic, H. nudus will undergo rapid metabolic alkalosis to compensate, unlike most crustaceans. H. nudus is able to tolerate hemolymph pH levels of 8.19, indicating this compensation is an evolved response. Even in water oxygen concentrations as low as 10 mmHg PO_{2}, H. nudus will increase cardiac output but will not hyperventilate or increase heart rate. This is achieved by increasing haemocyanin O_{2} affinity and urate concentration, with internal alkalosis prompting these changes. Under normal oxygen conditions, H. nudus relies predominately on dissolved arterial O_{2} for adequate profusion but will transition to haemocyanin reliance in low oxygen environments. Furthermore, H. nudus has shown the ability to limit its use of urate oxidase in a temperature dependent manner, thus limiting its overall oxygen use. These adaptations indicate a strong evolutionary drive to survive in hypoxic waters and have been used to contest the theory that crustations evolved air breathing as a means to avoid hypoxia.

=== Metabolism ===
Hemigrapsus nudus can digest glucose, galactose, fucose. maltose, maltotriose, and maltotetraose, making its metabolism similar to other crabs. H. nudus is unable to digest trahalose and blood analysis indicates a preference towards acid-soluble glycoproteins. Maltose derivative metabolites serve as one of the primary energy sources for H. nudus. While H. nudus is generally able to metabolize maltose oligosaccharides, maltose levels in the blood can vary depending on the individual's diet and the time of year. H. nudus uses glucose-6-phosphate, a maltose derivative, as an intermediate in maltose oligosaccharide formation which, in turn, is used as an intermediate in glycogen synthesis. Glucose levels are largely independent of these factors since it can be further synthesized from circulating maltose or during glycogen breakdown. This glucose is used by the hepatopancreas as a major component in pre-molt chitin synthesis.
