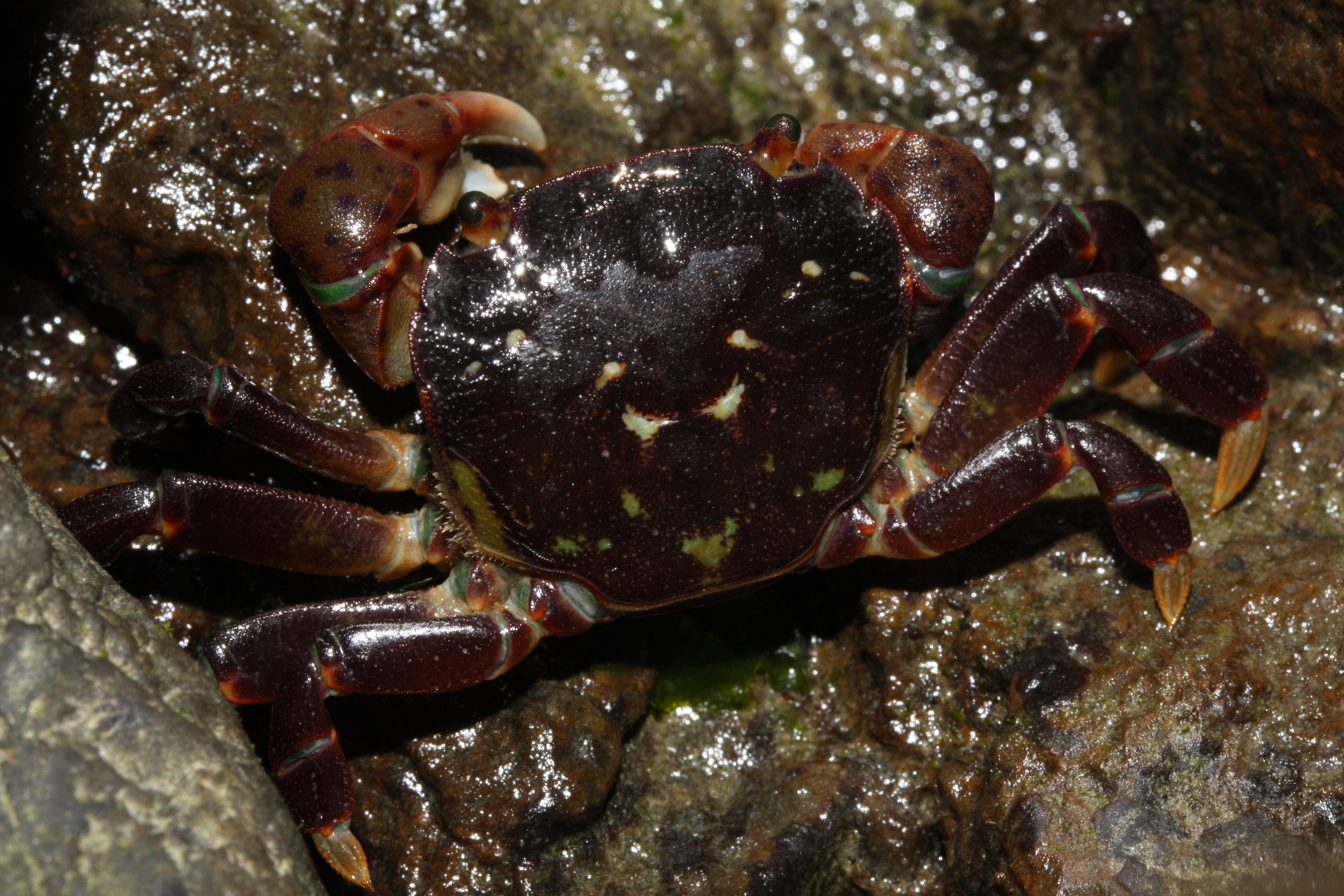
- Hemigrapsus nudus

Scientific classification
- Domain: Eukaryota
- Kingdom: Animalia
- Phylum: Arthropoda
- Class: Malacostraca
- Order: Decapoda
- Suborder: Pleocyemata
- Infraorder: Brachyura
- Family: Varunidae
- Subfamily: Varuninae
- Genus: Hemigrapsus; Dana, 1851

Type species
- Hemigrapsus crassimanus Dana, 1851

= Hemigrapsus =

Genus of crabs

Hemigrapsus is a genus of varunid crabs comprising thirteen species native almost exclusively in the Pacific Ocean, but two have been introduced to the North Atlantic region.

== Biogeography ==
The natural range of the genus is restricted to the Pacific Ocean, except for Hemigrapsus affinis which lives along the Atlantic coasts of South America, from Cape São Roque (Rio Grande do Norte state, Brazil) to the San Matías Gulf, (Patagonia, Argentina). H. estellinensis is almost certainly extinct, but was endemic to a hypersaline spring in the Texas Panhandle, 500 mi (800 km) from the sea. Populations of Hemigrapsus sanguineus have been introduced from the species' native range in East Asia to several places, and now range along the Atlantic coast of North American from Portland, Maine to North Carolina, along the West European coast from northern Spain to Denmark, and in the northern Adriatic Sea and northern Black Sea. H. takanoi is native to East Asia, but has been introduced to western Europe, now extending from northern Spain to Denmark, including the westernmost Baltic Sea area.

== Species ==
Fifteen species are currently recognised:

- Hemigrapsus affinis Dana, 1851
- Hemigrapsus crassimanus Dana, 1851
- Hemigrapsus crenulatus (H. Milne-Edwards, 1837)
- †Hemigrapsus estellinensis Creel, 1964
- Hemigrapsus gibbus (Hombron & Jacquinot, 1846)
- Hemigrapsus longitarsus (Miers, 1879)
- Hemigrapsus nudus (Dana, 1851)
- Hemigrapsus octodentatus (H. Milne-Edwards, 1837)
- Hemigrapsus oregonensis (Dana, 1851)
- Hemigrapsus pallipes (H. Milne-Edwards, 1837)
- Hemigrapsus penicillatus (De Haan, 1835)
- Hemigrapsus sanguineus (De Haan, 1835)
- Hemigrapsus sexdentatus (H. Milne-Edwards, 1837)
- Hemigrapsus sinensis Rathbun, 1931
- Hemigrapsus takanoi Asakura & Watanabe, 2005
