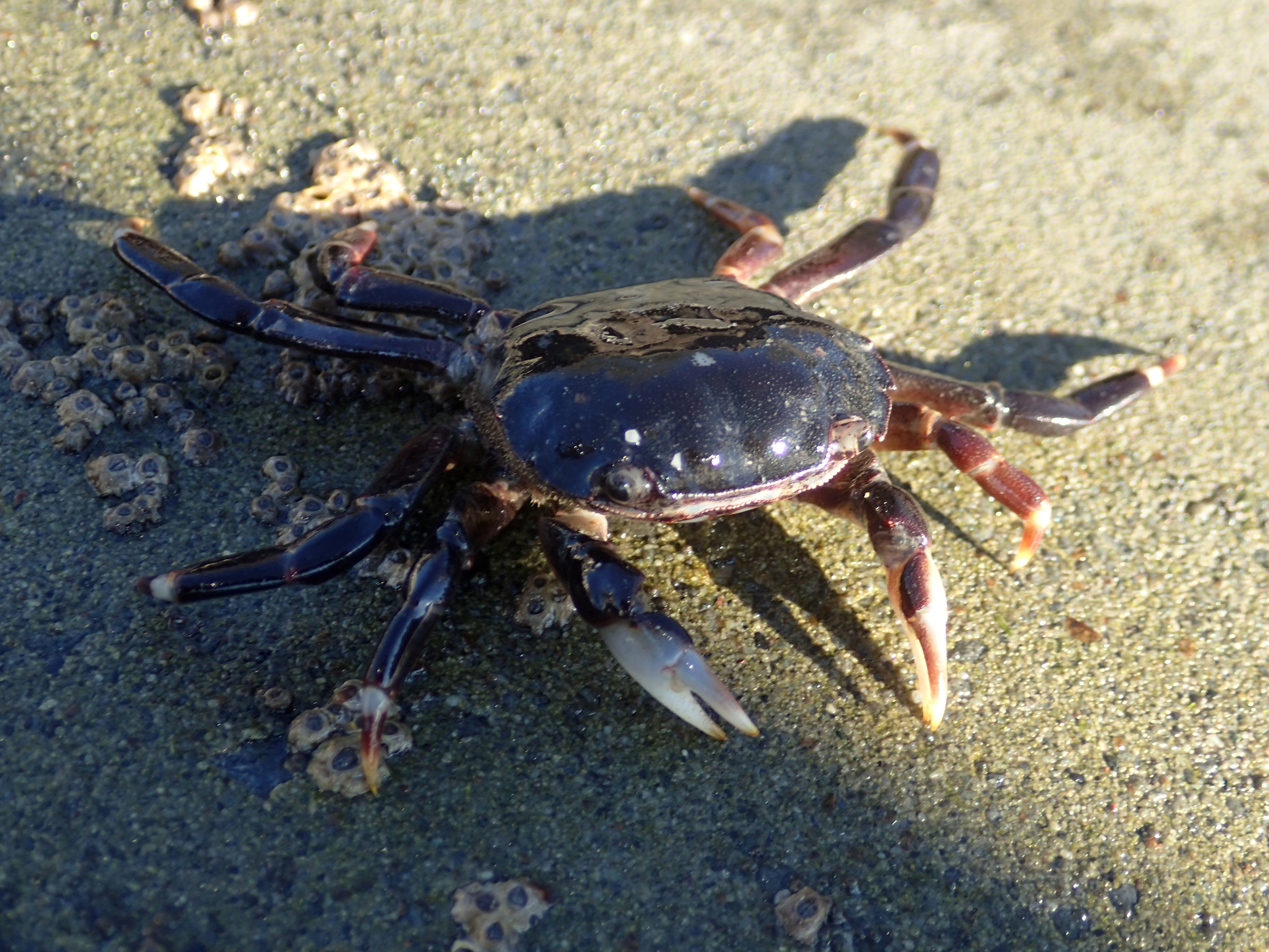

Scientific classification
- Domain: Eukaryota
- Kingdom: Animalia
- Phylum: Arthropoda
- Class: Malacostraca
- Order: Decapoda
- Suborder: Pleocyemata
- Infraorder: Brachyura
- Family: Varunidae
- Genus: Hemigrapsus
- Species: H. sexdentatus

Binomial name
- Hemigrapsus sexdentatus (H. Milne-Edwards, 1837)

Synonyms
- Hemigrapsus edwardsi (Hilgendorf, 1882); Hemigrapsus edwardsii (Hilgendorf, 1882)

= Hemigrapsus sexdentatus =

Species of crab

Hemigrapsus sexdentatus, also called the “common rock crab” or “common shore crab,” is a marine crab indigenous to the southern shores of New Zealand. This crab is a member of the Varunidae family in the order Decapoda.

== History ==
H. sexdentatus was previously referred to by the name Hemigrapsus edwardsii. However, problems with its generic definition incited studies to be done comparing the crab to three other crab genera: Brachynotus, Heterograpsus, Hemigrapsus. These issues were resolved and the species of New Zealand crab was found to belong in Hemigrapsus and should be known as H. sexdentatus.

== Description ==
H. sexdentatus females can grow to widths around 45 millimeters (1.8 inches) and males to 55 millimeters (2.2 inches). Located in the phylum Arthropoda and subphylum Crustacea, this species displays the typical Crustacea characteristics, but has unique qualities. H. sexdentatus have a distinctive square carapace (shell) with two teeth on either side. The chela (claws) are typically short, but can be large in males. These crabs are primarily grey, but have two basic color and size types for patch markings: pale and dark. The pale form has large pale to dark red patches, while the dark form has smaller dark purple to blue-black patches. In both forms the color of the dorsal carapace tends to be darker toward the front, fading and becoming more sparse toward the back, while the underside of the crab is white. The legs and claws are white with red to purple pigmentation to the same degree and hue as the carapace.

== Reproduction and Development ==
H. sexdentatus have both male and female sexes. Males are distinguished by their visible bulges of white muscle protruding the joint of the nippers, as females lack these bulges. Females carry eggs throughout the southern hemisphere winter months (April to September) and are able to carry up to 26,000 eggs, which average in size at 0.35 nm. Multiple studies have investigated the reproductive behavior of H. sexdentatus. Female receptivity and male–male competition were studied in a laboratory population to find male-male competition to be the dominant factor in pair formation and female receptiveness to vary in the presence of males. This competition can be seen in reproductive outcomes, as larger males were more likely to breed more frequently and able to remove a female mate from a smaller male crab. Less dominantly, female control over receptivity in relation to male presence could influence the outcome of sexual selection during the breeding period. It has also been shown that during development the embryos begin to form osmoregulatory functions from the earliest embryonic stages of these crustaceans.

== Behavior ==
H. sexdentaus are very agile and rapidly moving, but are relatively easy to handle. They are found emerging from crevices or under boulders typically at night to find prey. H. sexdentaus behavior has strong tidal rhythmicity, with two peaks every 25 hours. They are most active when the tide is in and remains quiescent. Direct social and maintenance behaviors of H. sexdentaus have not been studied in depth, however the closely related H. nudus has been shown to have 15 social and 12 maintenance behaviors. Social behaviors are used to defend food, space, and mates. Pairs of equal-sized crabs behave more aggressively than pairs of unequal-sized crabs. Resident crabs defend their space against invasion by non-resident crabs.

== Ecology ==
H. sexdentaus inhabits the rocky shore intertidal zone of the New Zealand coast. This crab has been identified throughout the length of New Zealand, but found more abundantly on the southern shores because the species O. truncatus replaces it in the north. They are found on relatively sheltered, rocky, and muddy shores from high tide level to around mid-tide level. They have been known to feed on sea snails, breaking through their hard shells with its chela, and also drift algae. H. sexdentaus has relatively few fish predators, but has been found in the stomachs of rig, red cod and sea perch. Cephalopods and zoea have also been found to prey on this crab.

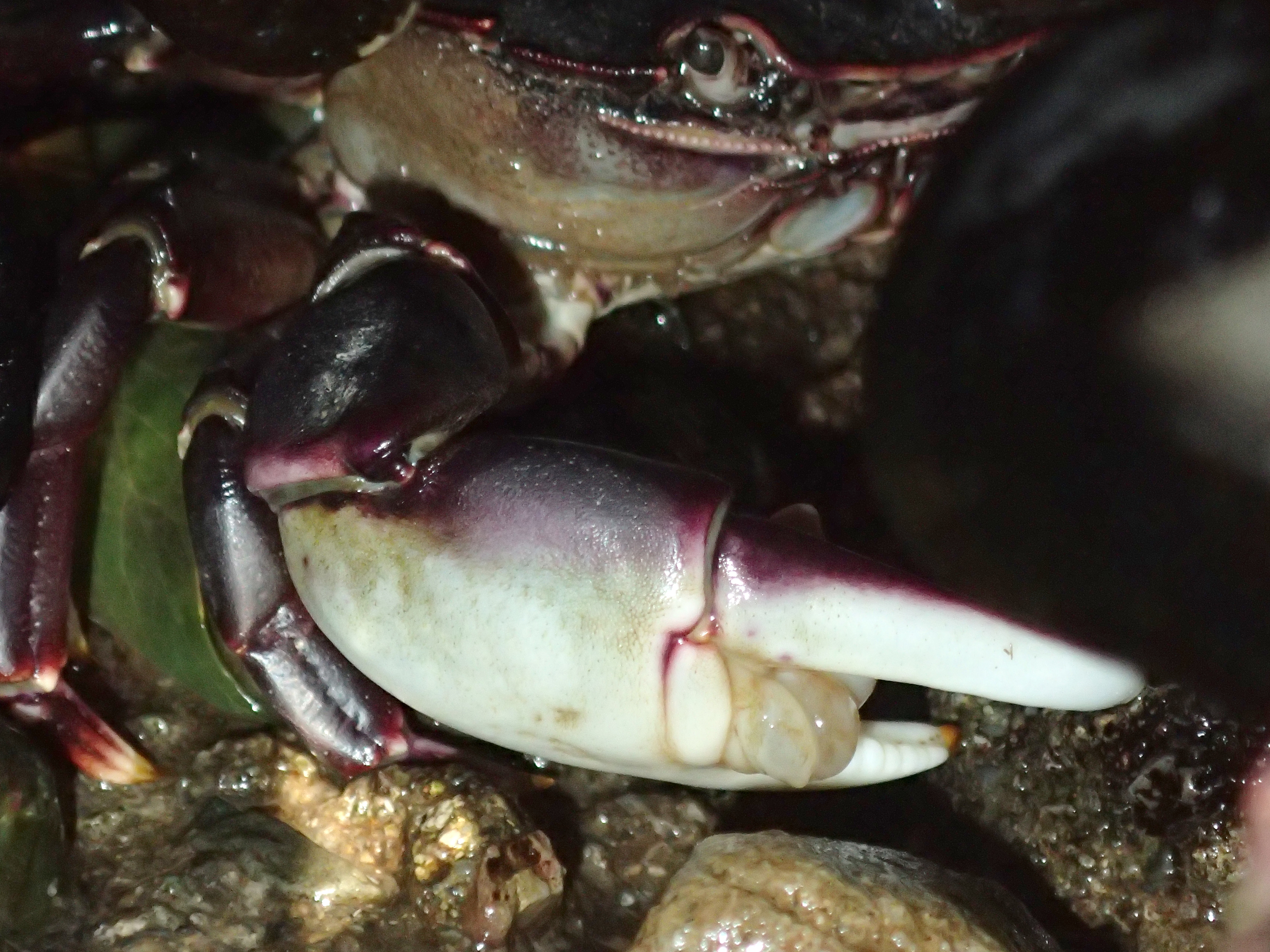
Muscle bulge on claw of male rock crab
