= Pachygrapsus minutus =

Scientific classification
- Kingdom: Animalia
- Phylum: Arthropoda
- Clade: Pancrustacea
- Class: Malacostraca
- Order: Decapoda
- Suborder: Pleocyemata
- Infraorder: Brachyura
- Family: Grapsidae
- Genus: Pachygrapsus
- Species: P. minutus

Binomial name
- Pachygrapsus minutus A. Milne-Edwards, 1873

Species of crab

Pachygrapsus minutus is a species of small shore crabs in the family Grapsidae.

== Description ==
Pachygrapsus minutus has a broad chitinized exoskeleton, tucked tail-like abdomen and five pairs of legs, indicative of the infraorder Brachyura. It can be confused with the similar sized Pachygrapsus planifrons but is distinguishable at a closer look. It has a smooth sub-triangular carapace of 5x8 mm with no teeth on its lateral margins. Its outer legs are furnished with spines and bristles and its claws are smooth, without setae on the tip. Additionally, its front is sinuous and the posterior meru has a submedian tooth.

== Reproduction ==
Like other grapsids, Pachygrapsus minutus perform precopulatory courtship rituals through olfactory and tactile cues. They are also gonochoric and males mostly transfer their sperms indirectly.

== Distribution and habitat ==
Pachygrapsus minutus is widespread throughout the Indo-West Pacific from the Red Sea to Mexican oceanic islands, and Hawaii. It is commonly found under rocks and corals within intertidal or rocky shallow zones living among barnacles, preferably dead, and oysters. It can also be found within the crevices of sheer rock cliffs. However, due to its small size it is often unnoticed.

== Ecology ==
During low tides, Pachygrapsus minutus can be seen grazing algae film on rocks but they also feast on organic waste, carrions, and other smaller invertebrates such as polychaetes, sponges, echinoderms, mollusks, and crustaceans.
