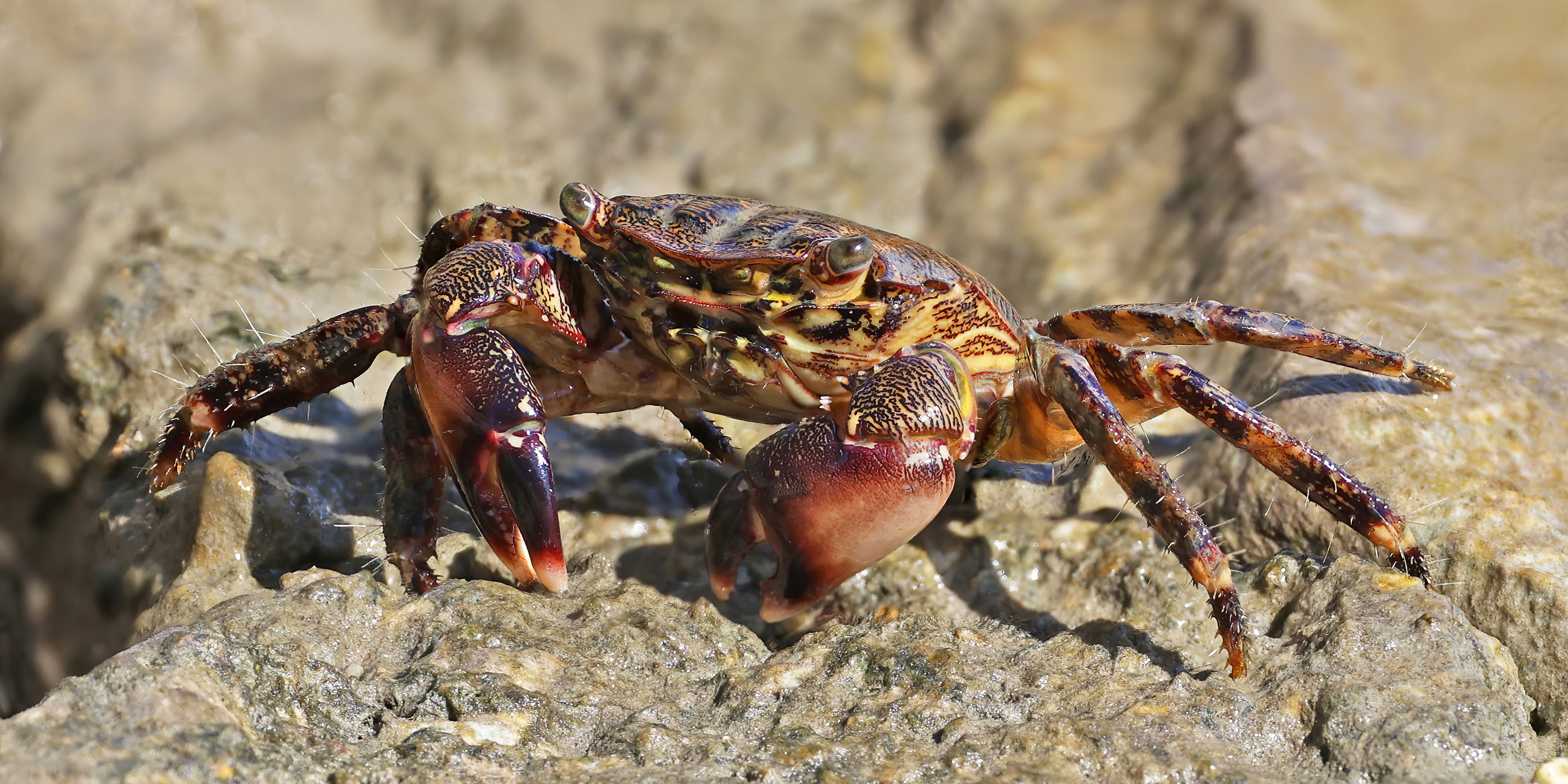
- At Butrint in Albania

Scientific classification
- Kingdom: Animalia
- Phylum: Arthropoda
- Clade: Pancrustacea
- Class: Malacostraca
- Order: Decapoda
- Suborder: Pleocyemata
- Infraorder: Brachyura
- Family: Grapsidae
- Genus: Pachygrapsus
- Species: P. marmoratus

Binomial name
- Pachygrapsus marmoratus (Fabricius, 1787)

Synonyms
- Cancer marmoratus Fabricius, 1787; Cancer femoralis Olivier, 1791; Grapsus varius Latreille, 1803; Grapsus savignyi De Haan, 1835

= Pachygrapsus marmoratus =

Species of crab

Pachygrapsus marmoratus is a species of crab, sometimes called the marbled rock crab or marbled crab, which lives in the Black Sea, the Mediterranean Sea and parts of the Atlantic Ocean. It is dark violet brown, with yellow marbling, and with a body up to 36 millimetres (1.4 in) long. A semiterrestrial omnivore, it feeds on algae and various animals including mussels and limpets.

== Description ==
Pachygrapsus marmoratus has a square carapace 22–36 millimetres (0.87–1.42 in) long, which is dark violet brown with marbling in yellow. It can be distinguished from related species of Pachygrapsus in the Mediterranean Sea (Pachygrapsus maurus and Pachygrapsus transversus) by the presence of three teeth on each side of the carapace. It is capable of very rapid movements, and it uses this ability to dart into crevices, making it difficult to catch.

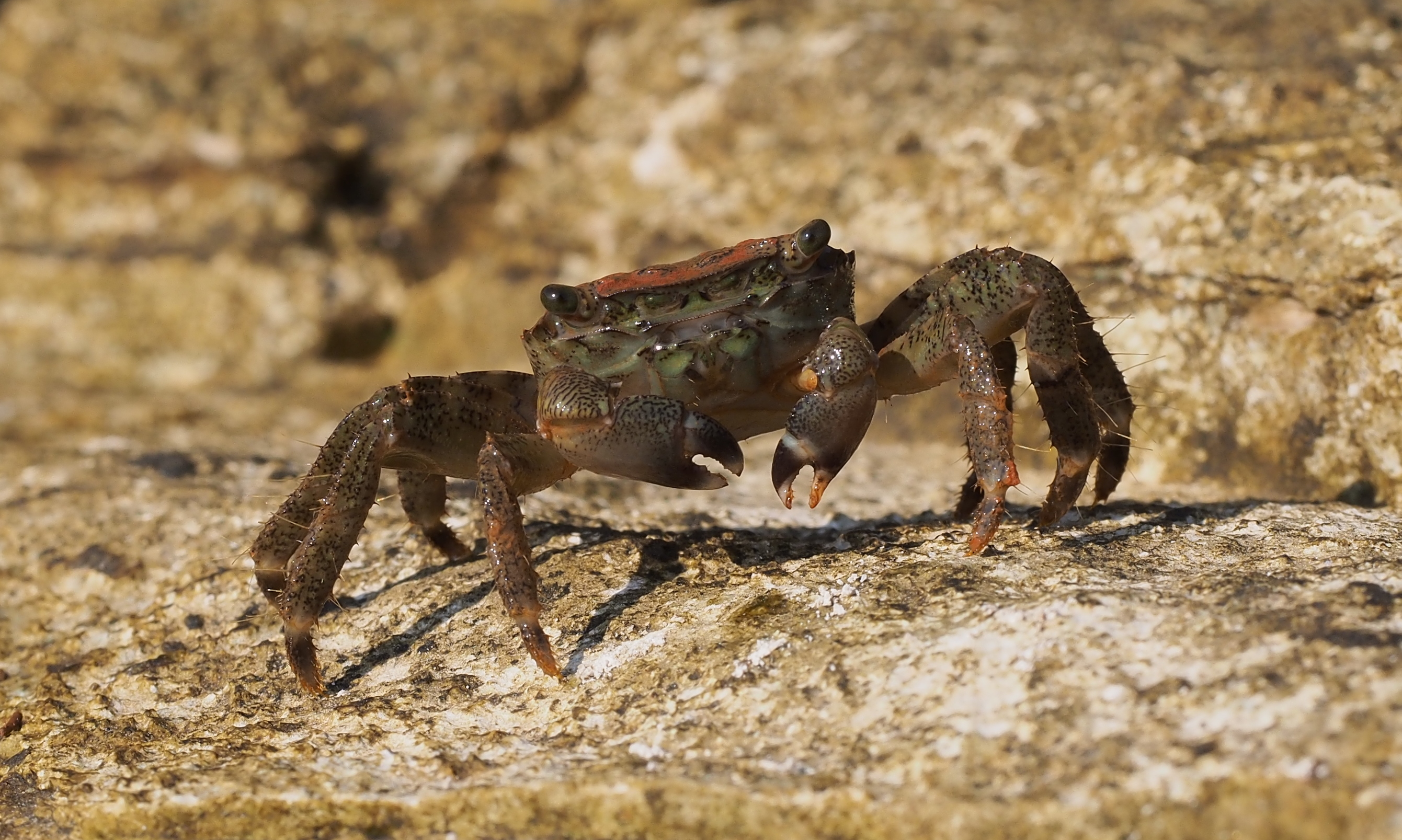
On the Adriatic Sea coastline, Croatia

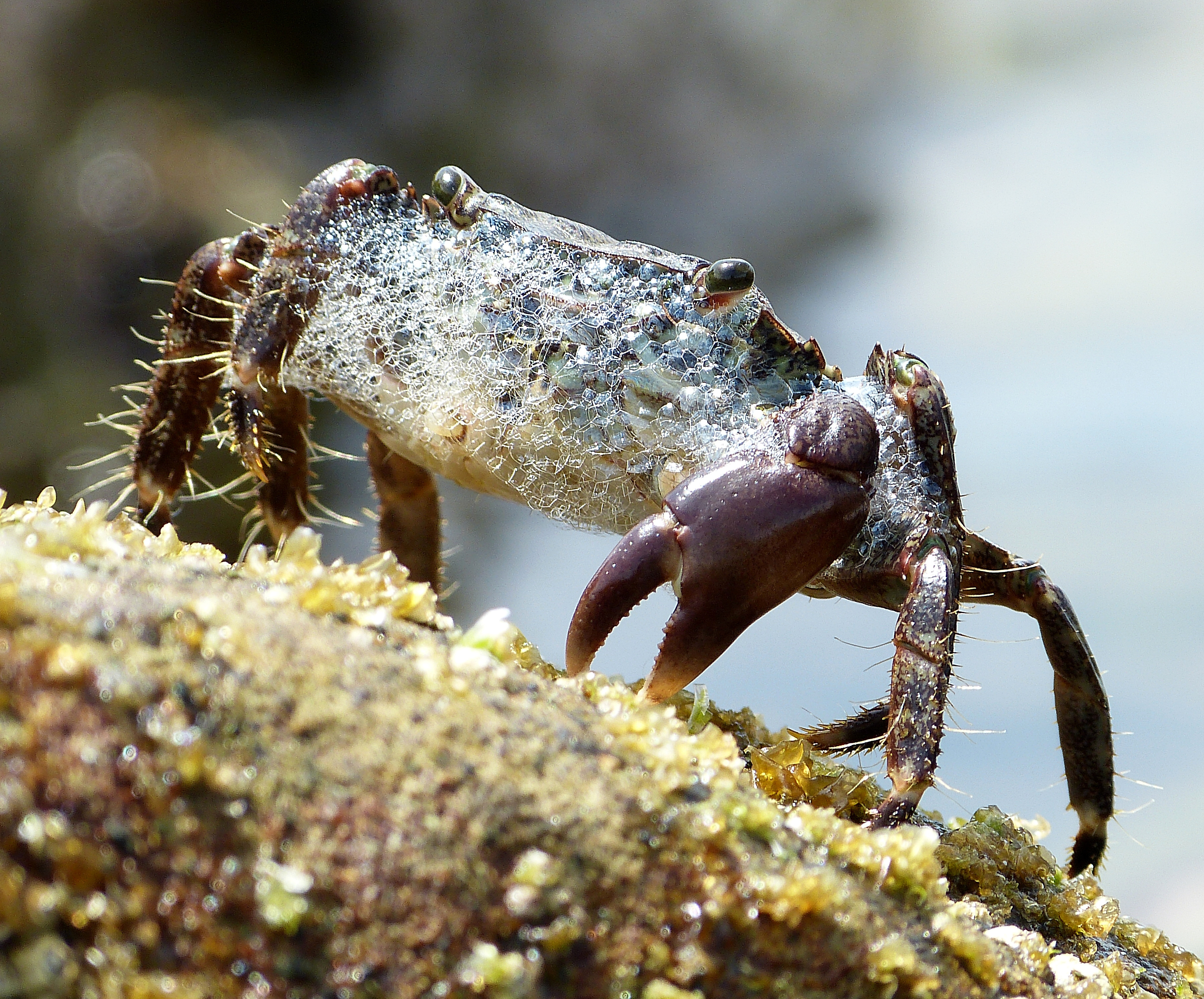

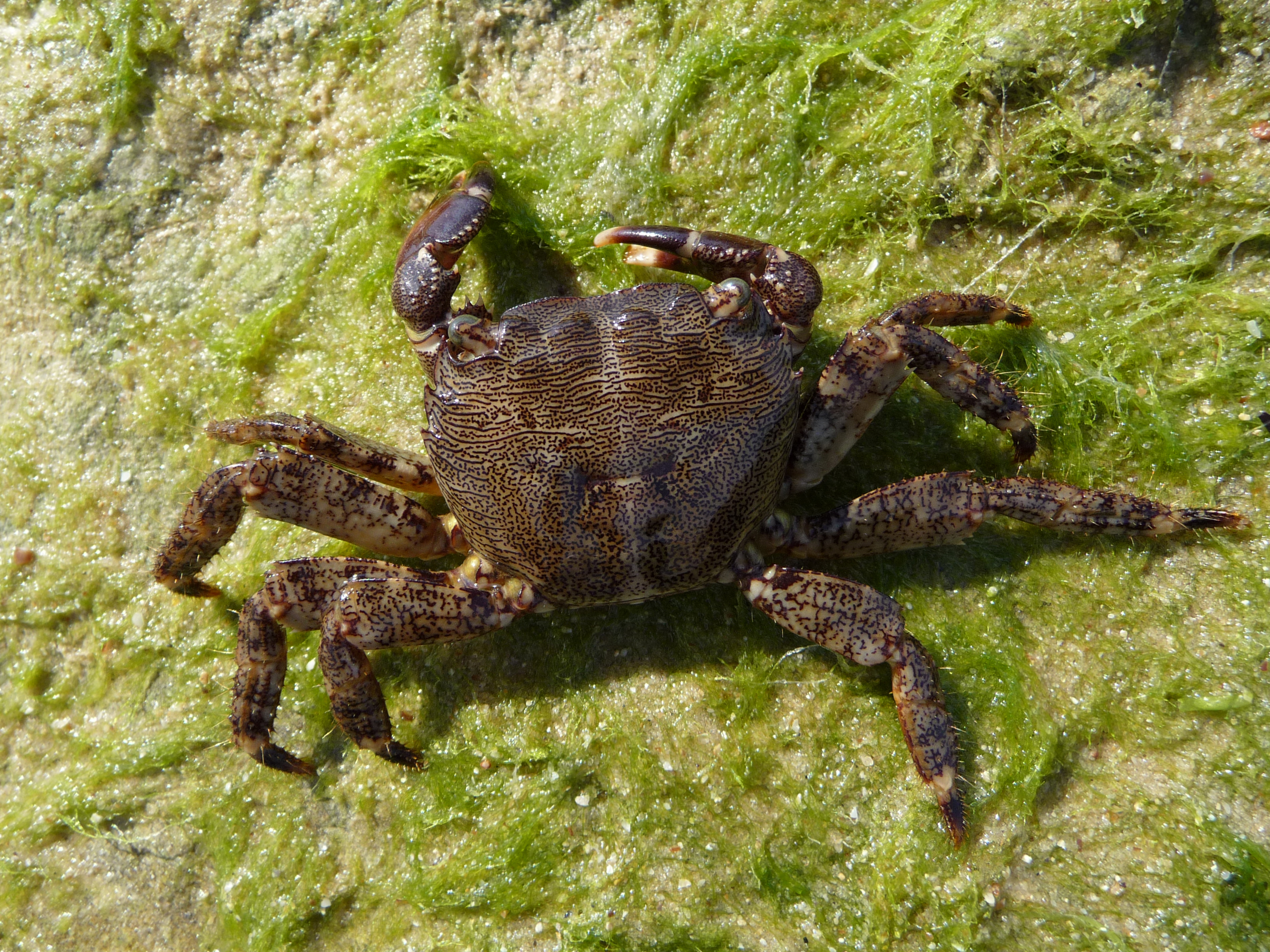
In the Black Sea

Video of algae grazing

== Distribution ==
It is widespread in Southern Europe, from the Black Sea to the Moroccan coast, and along the Atlantic coasts of Portugal, Spain and France, and was observed as early as 1996 as far north as Southampton in the English Channel. This range expansion may be due to the warming of the surface waters.

== Ecology ==
Pachygrapsus marmoratus is an omnivore, but not an opportunist; similar proportions of algae and animals are consumed however abundant they are in the habitat. The favoured animals in the diet of P. marmoratus are mussels, limpets and its own species. When attacking the limpet Patella depressa, Pachygrapsus marmoratus uses a consistent method, which is usually unsuccessful. On more sheltered shores, P. grapsus eats fewer mussels, but compensates with a greater consumption of barnacles.

Predators of Pachygrapsus marmoratus include the musky octopus, Eledone moschata.

The larvae of P. marmoratus are planktonic and may survive for up to 31 days. This results in high levels of gene flow between populations, and allows the species to rapidly colonise new areas.
