= Pachygrapsus plicatus =

Scientific classification
- Kingdom: Animalia
- Phylum: Arthropoda
- Clade: Pancrustacea
- Class: Malacostraca
- Order: Decapoda
- Suborder: Pleocyemata
- Infraorder: Brachyura
- Family: Grapsidae
- Genus: Pachygrapsus
- Species: P. plicatus

Binomial name
- Pachygrapsus plicatus H. Milne Edwards, 1837

Species of crab

Pachygrapsus plicatus is a species of small shore crabs in the family Grapsidae.
