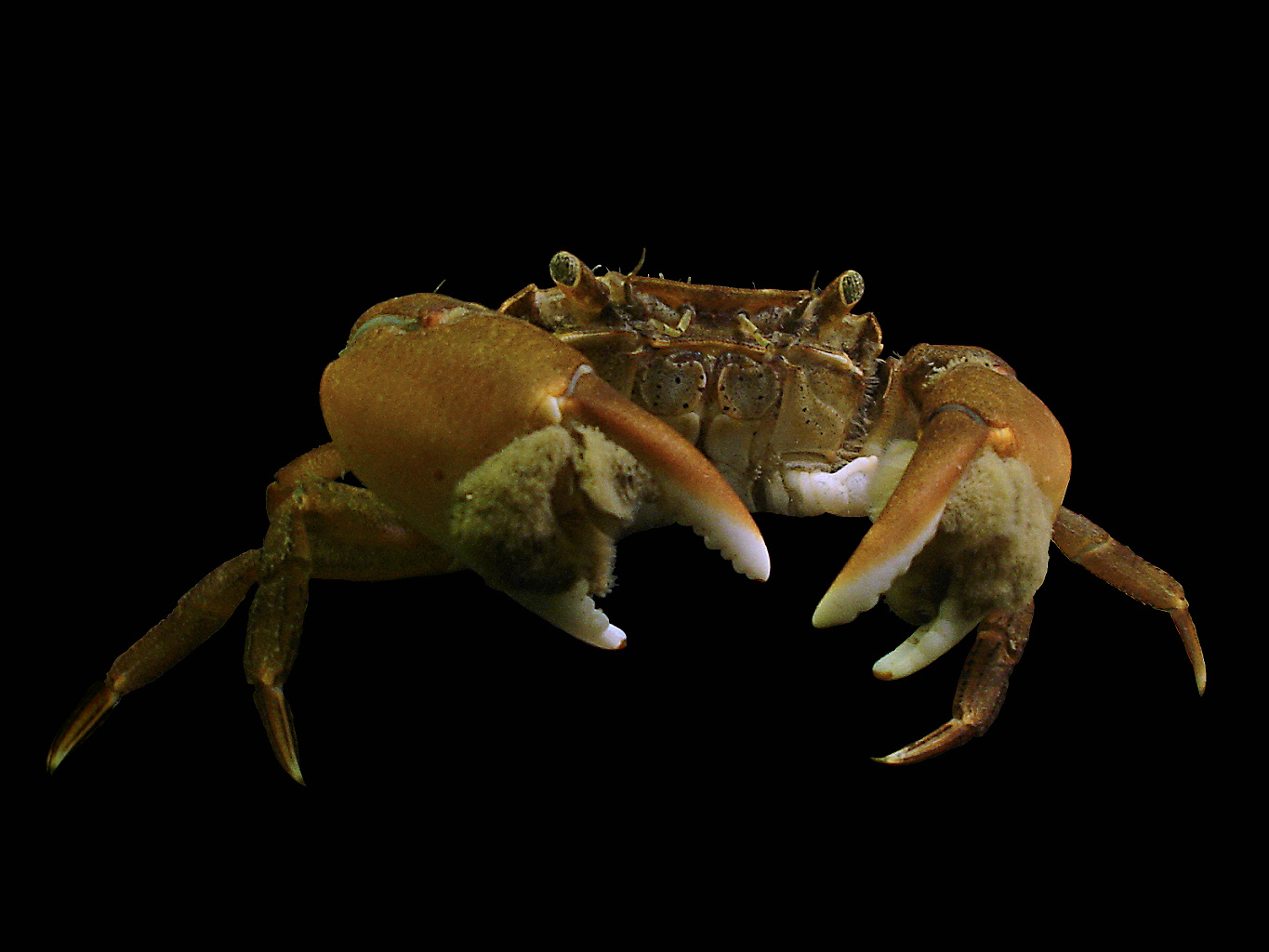
- Frontal view of male, showing the large patches of setae on the claws

Scientific classification
- Kingdom: Animalia
- Phylum: Arthropoda
- Class: Malacostraca
- Order: Decapoda
- Suborder: Pleocyemata
- Infraorder: Brachyura
- Family: Varunidae
- Genus: Hemigrapsus
- Species: H. takanoi

Binomial name
- Hemigrapsus takanoi Asakura & Watanabe, 2005

= Hemigrapsus takanoi =

Species of crab

Hemigrapsus takanoi, the brush-clawed shore crab or Asian shore crab, is a small crab of the family Varunidae (formerly classified as Grapsidae) that lives on rocky shores surrounding the Pacific Ocean, and which is invasive along the European coastlines. This crab is omnivorous and eats small fish, invertebrates and algae.

== Description ==
Prior to 2005, the name Hemigrapsus penicillatus was used to cover animals that are now known to represent two distinct species. Hemigrapsus penicillatus (sensu stricto) has smaller patches of setae (bristles) on the chelae (claws) in males; Hemigrapsus takanoi has larger setal patches and larger coloured spots on the exoskeleton. It can be a variety of colors, including orange-brown, maroon, or green, with striped legs and spotted claws. Male brush-clawed shore crabs have a patch of light brown or yellow bristles (known as setae) on their chelae (pincers). Their carapace width typically reaches about 2.5 centimetres (1.0 in), and has three spines. Before developing into juvenile crabs, larval brush-clawed crabs spend almost one month floating in the ocean. This allows them to find food and new habitats.

== Distribution ==
Hemigrapsus takanoi is native to Japan, Korea, Russia and China, although the limits of its distribution are still unclear.

=== Introduced distribution ===
Hemigrapsus takanoi has been introduced to the coasts of Europe by human agency, and has become an invasive species there. Although originally reported as Hemigrapsus penicillatus, that species has since been divided into two species, and it is H. takanoi, not H. penicillatus which occurs on the coasts of Europe. It is thought to have arrived in 1993, having been discovered in La Rochelle, France, in 1994. A study of hull fouling animals on ships in Hamburg Dockyard and Bremerhaven at the time found six specimens of H. takanoi on the car-carrying ship SPICA, which travelled between the Asian ports of Tokyo, Osaka, Kobe and Pusan, and Europe. The ship was known to have passed the French coast in 1993, and it is thought that the introduction is likely to have occurred when crabs fell from the hull of the SPICA at that time.

By 1997, its range in Europe extended from Fromentine in France (adjacent to the Île de Noirmoutier) to Laredo, Spain, covering a coastline of 700 kilometres (430 mi) around the Bay of Biscay. By 1999, it had reached Le Havre on the English Channel, and by 2005, it had reached the French Opal Coast at the entrance to the North Sea. Based on the native climate, it was predicted in 1999 that H. takanoi would spread across much of the North Sea and western parts of the Baltic Sea. This was later confirmed, with first documented records in the Dutch Wadden Sea in 2004, in the German Wadden Sea in 2007 and the Danish Wadden Sea in 2011. Its northward spread along the western coast of Jutland has continued, it now also being present in the Limfjord and Oslofjord in Norway. It was first confirmed in Great Britain in 2014 when discovered on the southeastern coast at the Medway Estuary. The first record in the Baltic region was in 2014 when individuals were caught in the Kiel Fjord in Germany, likely having arrived via the many ships that pass through the Kiel Canal (which connects the North Sea and Baltic Sea region), and in 2018 it was first recorded in Denmark's South Funen Archipelago. In 2023, two adult males were recorded in Poland in Gdańsk Bay, but establishment in the Baltic Proper might be limited by low salinity impairing larval development.
