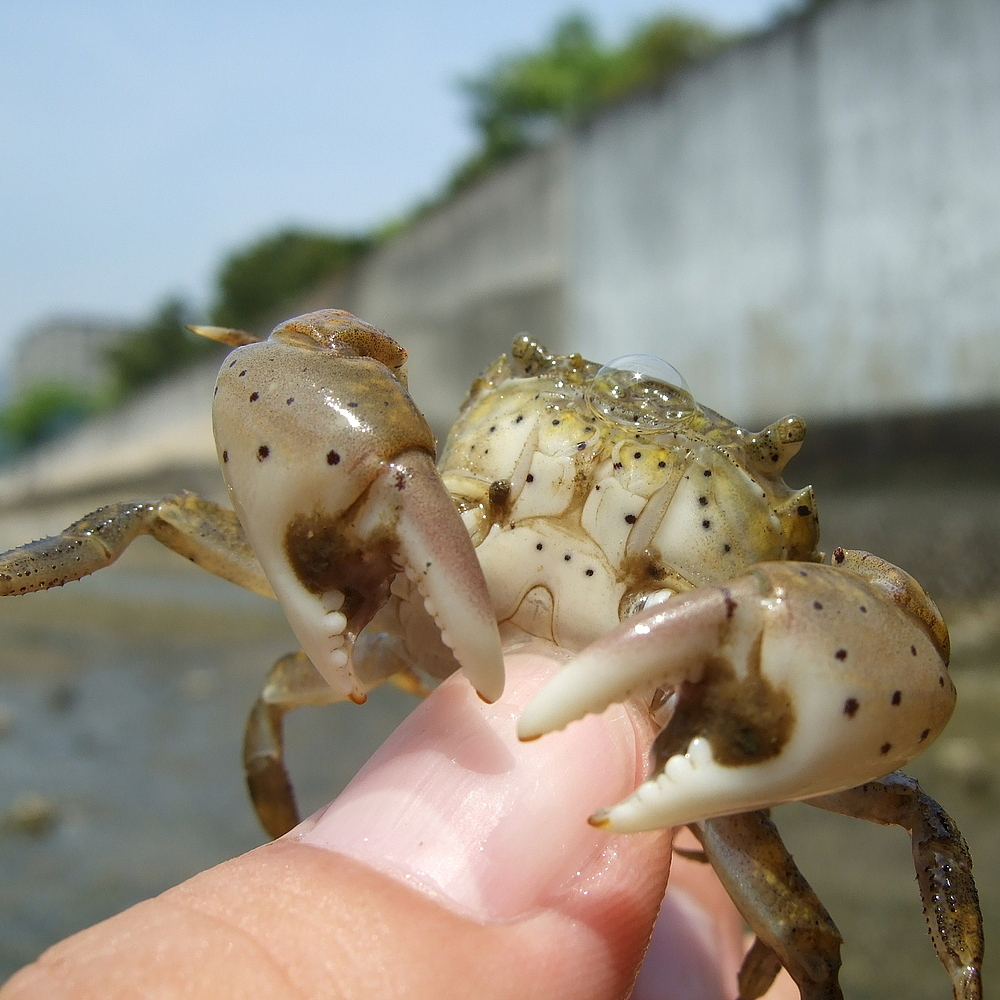

Scientific classification
- Kingdom: Animalia
- Phylum: Arthropoda
- Class: Malacostraca
- Order: Decapoda
- Suborder: Pleocyemata
- Infraorder: Brachyura
- Family: Varunidae
- Genus: Hemigrapsus
- Species: H. penicillatus

Binomial name
- Hemigrapsus penicillatus (De Haan, 1835)

= Hemigrapsus penicillatus =

Species of crab

Hemigrapsus penicillatus is a species of crab. The native range of Hemigrapsus penicillatus extends from the Russian Far East (Kuril Islands and Aniva Bay) along the coasts of Japan, China, Taiwan and Korea, as far south-west as Hong Kong. Although the species was reported from Hawaii in 1903, this is likely to have been an error; there are no recent records of the species in the central Pacific. Reports of H. penicillatus on the coasts of Europe refer to a related species, H. takanoi, which was only distinguished from H. penicillatus in 2005, several years after its discovery in Europe. Hemigrapsus penicillatus lives in the intertidal zone on stony or muddy shores.
