= Medway Estuary and Marshes =

Protected area in Kent, England

Coordinates: 51.408°N 0.657°E

- Site of Special Scientific Interest
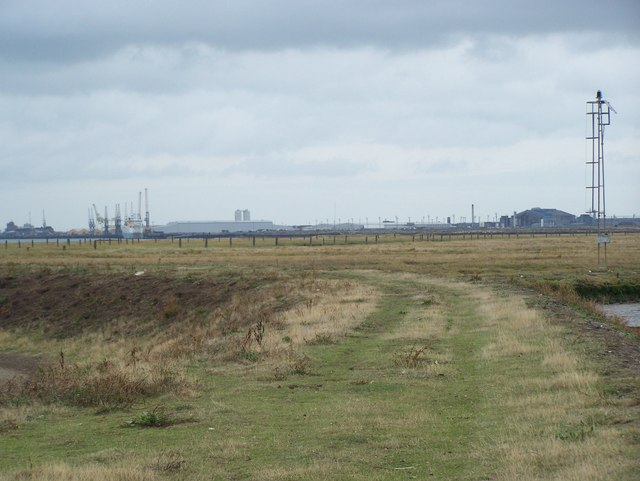
- Location of Medway Estuary and Marshes.
- Area of search: Kent
- Grid reference: TQ 849 710
- Interest: Biological
- Area: 4,748.8 hectares (11,735 acres)
- Notification date: 1991
- Location map: Magic Map

Medway Estuary and Marshes is a 4,748.8-hectare (11,735-acre) biological Site of Special Scientific Interest which stretches along the banks of the River Medway between Gillingham and Sheerness in Kent, England. It is a Nature Conservation Review site, Grade I, a Ramsar internationally important wetland site, and a Special Protection Area under the European Union Directive on the Conservation of Wild Birds. Part of the land area designated as Medway Estuary and Marshes SSSI is owned by the Church Commissioners.

This site is internationally important for its wintering birds, and nationally important for its breeding birds. It is also has an outstanding flora, such as the nationally rare oak-leaved goosefoot and the nationally scarce slender hare's-ear.
