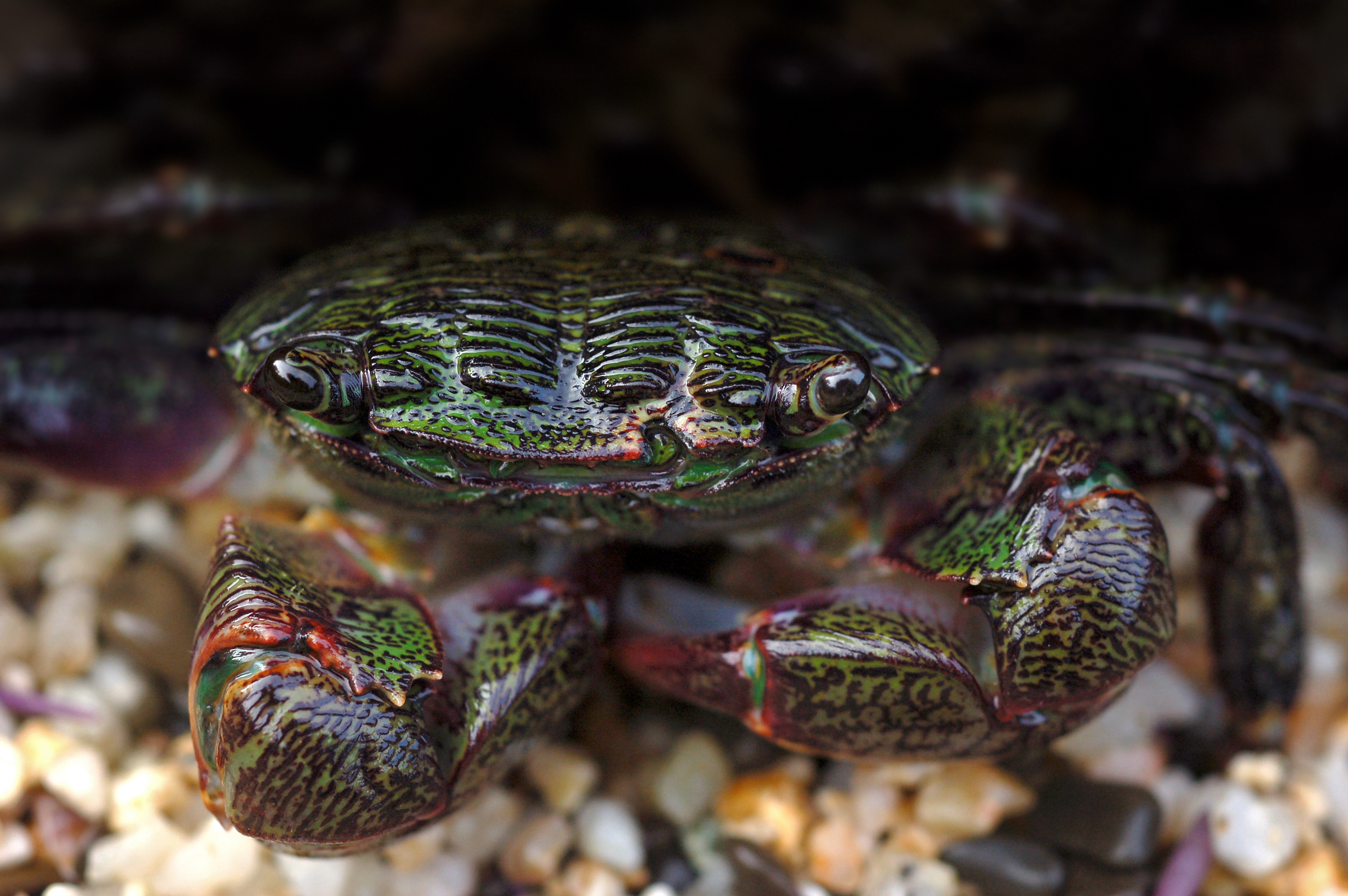
- Striped shore crab, Pachygrapsus crassipes

Scientific classification
- Kingdom: Animalia
- Phylum: Arthropoda
- Clade: Pancrustacea
- Class: Malacostraca
- Order: Decapoda
- Suborder: Pleocyemata
- Infraorder: Brachyura
- Family: Grapsidae
- Subfamily: Grapsinae
- Genus: Pachygrapsus; Randall, 1839

= Pachygrapsus =

Pachygrapsus Temporal range: Miocene–recent

Genus of crabs

Pachygrapsus is a genus of small shore crabs. Recent genetic data suggest this genus to be possibly polyphyletic.

It comprises the following species:

- Pachygrapsus corrugatus (von Martens, 1872)
- Pachygrapsus crassipes Randall, 1840
- Pachygrapsus fakaravensis Rathbun, 1907
- Pachygrapsus gracilis (Saussure, 1858)
- Pachygrapsus laevimanus Stimpson, 1858
- Pachygrapsus loveridgei Chace, 1966
- Pachygrapsus marmoratus (Fabricius, 1787)
- Pachygrapsus maurus (Lucas, 1846)
- Pachygrapsus minutus A. Milne-Edwards, 1873
- Pachygrapsus planifrons De Man, 1888
- Pachygrapsus plicatus (H. Milne-Edwards, 1837)
- Pachygrapsus propinquus De Man, 1908
- Pachygrapsus socius Stimpson, 1871
- Pachygrapsus transversus (Gibbes, 1850)
- Mottled Shore Crab aka Pachygrapsus transversus on Bonaire (Caribbean Netherlands) in October 2026
