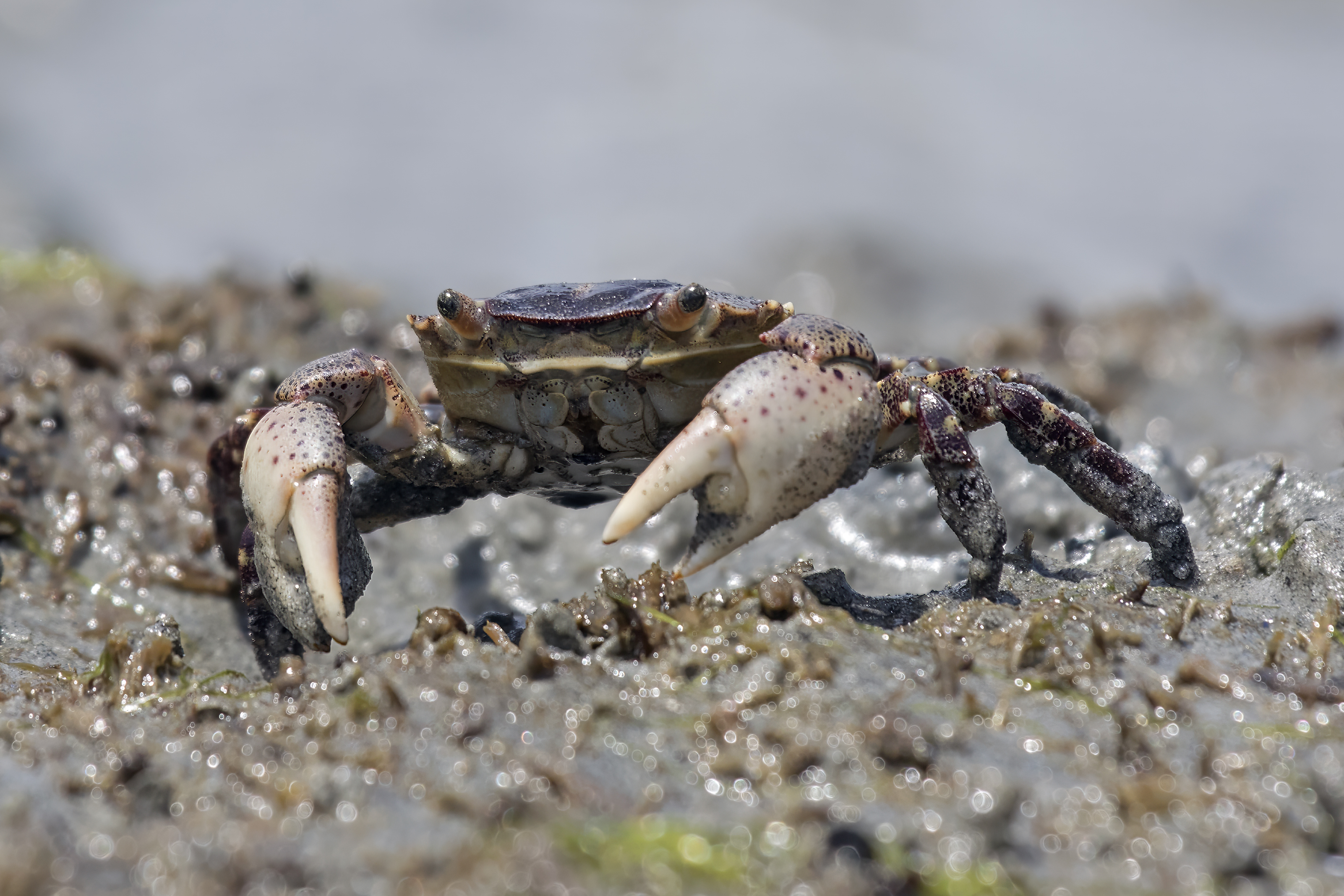
- An Asian shore crab on the Great Bay, New Jersey, USA

Scientific classification
- Kingdom: Animalia
- Phylum: Arthropoda
- Clade: Pancrustacea
- Class: Malacostraca
- Order: Decapoda
- Suborder: Pleocyemata
- Infraorder: Brachyura
- Family: Varunidae
- Genus: Hemigrapsus
- Species: H. sanguineus

Binomial name
- Hemigrapsus sanguineus (De Haan, 1853)

Synonyms
- Grapsus (Grapsus) sanguineus De Haan, 1835; Heterograpsus maculatus H. Milne-Edwards, 1853

= Hemigrapsus sanguineus =

Species of crab

Hemigrapsus sanguineus, the Japanese shore crab or Asian shore crab, is a species of crab from East Asia. It has been introduced to several other regions, and is now an invasive species in North America and Europe. It was introduced to these regions by ships from Asia emptying their ballast tanks in coastal waters.

== Description ==
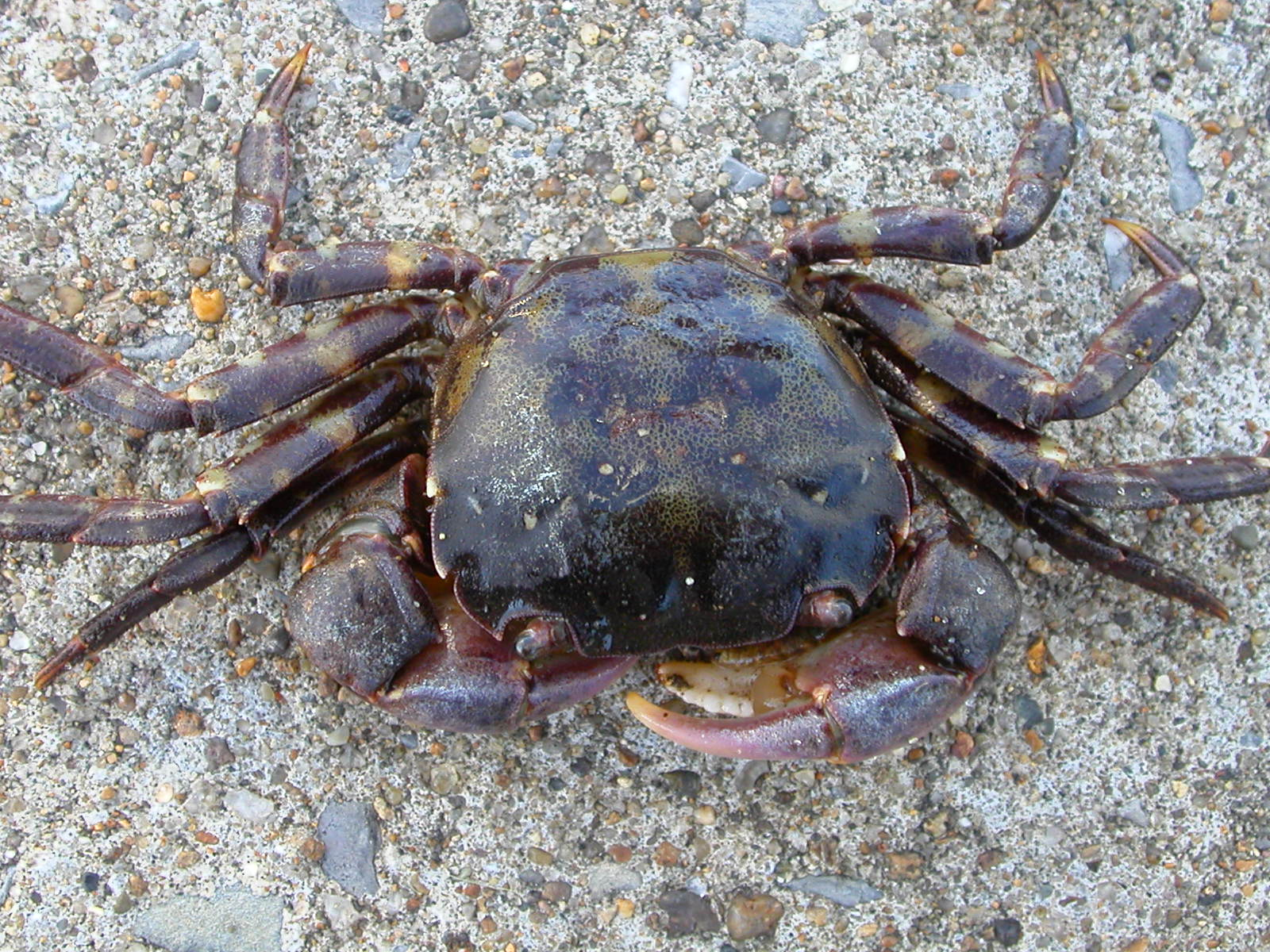

H. sanguineus has a squarish carapace, 2 inches (50 mm) in width, with three teeth along the forward sides; its pereiopods are marked with alternating light and dark bands. The males have a bulb-like structure at the base of the movable finger on their claws. Other distinguishing features include three spines on each side of the carapace. Adult sizes range from 35–42 mm width. These crabs are opportunistic omnivores that tend to favor other animals over algae. As crab density in an invaded area increases, so does the breadth of the species' diet, which suggests that competition alters selection of food. There currently is no mitigation against these crabs. A natural enemy of H. sanguineus is Sacculina polygenea, a parasite that attacks adult shore crabs and is specific to H. sanguineus.

== Ecology and life cycle ==
Hemigrapsus sanguineus is an "opportunistic omnivore" that prefers to eat other animals, especially molluscs, when possible. It tolerates a wide range of salinities (euryhaline) and temperatures (eurythermic).

Females produce up to 50,000 eggs at a time, and can produce 3–4 broods per year. The eggs hatch into zoea larvae, which develop through four further zoea stages, and one megalopa stage, over the course of 16–25 days. The eggs typically hatch in late summer or fall, into larvae, and the juvenile crabs molt in five stages to become megalopae, which typically takes about a month. Once in this stage, the crabs settle and metamorphize into full-grown crabs. The larvae are planktonic, can be transported for long distances during their development into benthic adults.

=== Habitat ===
Typically, the crabs live in areas with large rocks, such as between boulders on rocky shores. Hemigrapsus sanguineus inhabits many artificial structures such as on oyster reefs. H. sanguineus can tolerate other habitats, such as salt marshes.

== Ecological impacts ==
The invasion of the habitat by the H. sanguineus has been characterized by rapid geographical expansion and widespread displacement of competing crab species. Although this species has been introduced to such a large habitat, H. sanguineus is eaten by native crustacean-eating fish in these areas. Since the crabs are so abundant, some types of native fish even prefer the invading crab. This may be due to the mouths of fish adapting to the size of H. sanguineus because they are the most abundant food source. On the other hand, native crabs also have adapted to eat H. sanguineus, possibly due to the availability of the food source or as an anti-predator strategy. There is a possibility that H. sanguineus could expand in numbers in some areas where it is invasive, potentially overwhelming the habitat and out-competing native crustaceans, such as the blue crab and lobster.

== Diet ==
Because the crabs are opportunistic omnivores, they will eat anything they can get their mouths around. H. sanguineus prefers to consume animals, but during a period of starvation, these crabs tend not to show a food preference. Most of the animals consumed by H. sanguineus are small invertebrates, such as mussels, snails, and amphipods. The diet of these crabs is overall very broad.

== Distribution ==
The native distribution of H. sanguineus is in coastal waters of the northwestern Pacific Ocean, ranging from Peter the Great Bay in southern Russia, to Hong Kong.

=== Introduced distribution ===
The first record of this crab outside its native range was from Townsends Inlet, Cape May County, New Jersey (between Avalon and Sea Isle City) in 1988. The larvae are thought to have been transported via the fouled hulls of yachts. From the 1990s, it spread as an invasive species through similar vectors such as ballast water and became increasingly common, now ranging from eastern Maine (Great Wass Island) to North Carolina.

In 1999, H. sanguineus was reported for the first time from European waters, having been discovered at Le Havre (France) and the Oosterschelde estuary (in the Netherlands). It has since been found along a long stretch of the continental coast of the English Channel, from the Cotentin Peninsula to the Dover Strait. Its range has extended east and north along the North Sea coastline, including northwestern Germany and Western Jutland of Denmark. In the United Kingdom, it has been recorded from Guernsey and Jersey, and in Kent and south Wales. The species was first reported to be found in Sweden in 2012. In 2019, Swedish authorities reported that a private person collected more than 50 specimens of the crab in the vicinity of the island of Orust in the Skagerrak–Kattegat region. The specimens were very small, suggesting that the crab is now reproducing in Swedish waters. A couple of months later it was first reported from the Øresund, the narrow strait between the Danish Island of Zealand and the Swedish province of Scania. There is a single record of H. sanguineus in the Mediterranean Sea – a 2003 sighting in the northern Adriatic Sea – and a single specimen has been collected from the Romanian coast of the Black Sea, near Constanța, in 2008.

In 2020, positive identification of the species was confirmed within Port Phillip Bay, Victoria, Australia. Since then, there have been many verified sightings and it is now classed as an established species in Victoria, Australia.
