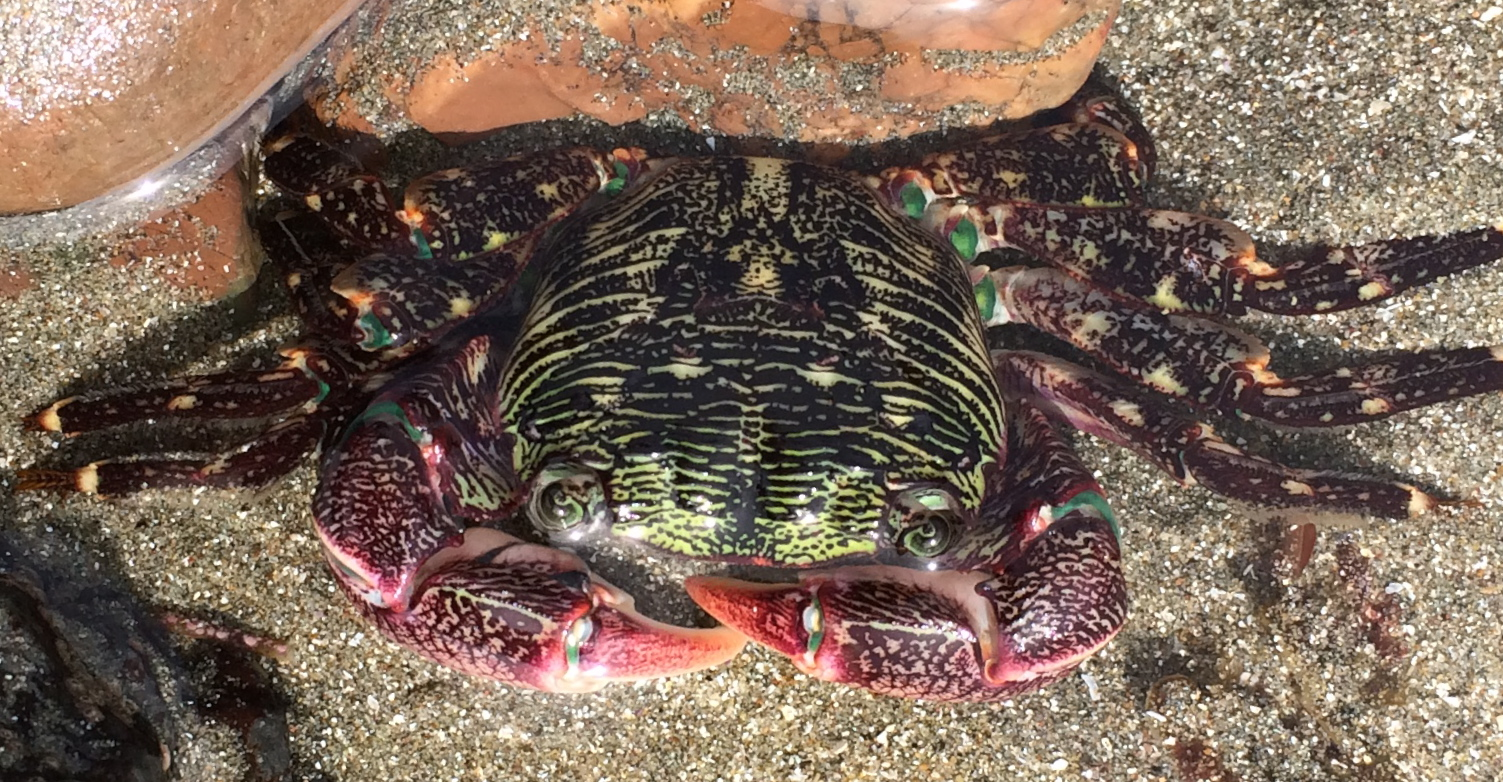

Scientific classification
- Kingdom: Animalia
- Phylum: Arthropoda
- Clade: Pancrustacea
- Class: Malacostraca
- Order: Decapoda
- Suborder: Pleocyemata
- Infraorder: Brachyura
- Family: Grapsidae
- Genus: Pachygrapsus
- Species: P. crassipes

Binomial name
- Pachygrapsus crassipes Randall, 1840

= Pachygrapsus crassipes =

Species of crab

Striped shore crab on a wet rock in the San Francisco Bay

Pachygrapsus crassipes, the striped shore crab or lined shore crab, is a small crab found on both rocky and hard-mud soft seashores of the northeastern and northwestern Pacific Ocean. In North America, this species occurs from central Oregon, south through California to near Ensenada, Baja California, Mexico. There is an isolated population with a wide range disjunction at Bamfield on Vancouver Island, Canada. The western Pacific population, including both Korea and Japan is isolated with a divergence time from the eastern Pacific population estimated between 0.8 and 1.2 Mya.

== Description ==
Typically, this crab will have a brown/purple or black carapace with green stripes. Its carapace is square and can reach 4 to 5 cm in size. The claws are red/purple with a mottled and striped pattern on the upper surface, and whitish-grayish on the lower surface, while its legs are purple and green with a similar mottled appearance.

== Behavior ==
It will spend over half of its time on land. It will purposely submerge to wet its gills but can sustain itself on land for up to ~70 hours. They enjoy hiding in small crevices within rock, but will emerge at night when there is less danger of predation. This opportunistic predator's diet consists of green algae, red algae, brown seaweed, diatoms, worms, mussels, small decaying organisms, limpets, snails, flies, hermit crabs, seaweed, isopods, and sometimes even each other when the lesser crab has just finished molting. They have preference to small mussels over larger mussels over seaweed. Although there will be aggressive intraspecies competition over food, they do not keep a standard territory to defend. Generally they are eaten by seagulls, octopuses, rats, raccoons, and humans, but are vulnerable to other organisms especially during their juvenile stages.

Hunting strategies will differ based on their habitat. On rocky shores they will hunt more often than they forage, and under the cover of night, whilst in intertidal pools they will focus more on herbivory even during daytime hours. Intraspecies conflicts occur more out of defense in close captivity out of water, whilst in water it occurs more out of aggression. Over time a social hierarchy for the species within its habitat will form.
