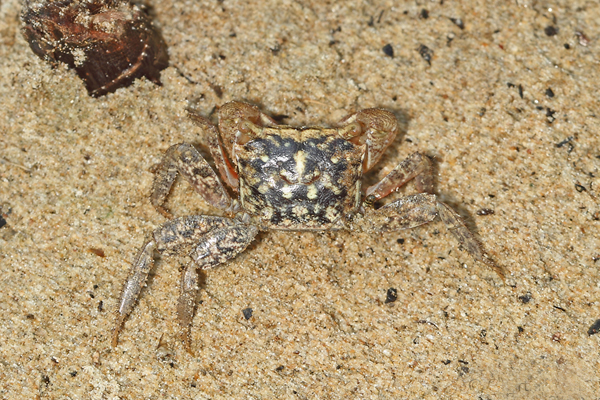

Scientific classification
- Domain: Eukaryota
- Kingdom: Animalia
- Phylum: Arthropoda
- Class: Malacostraca
- Order: Decapoda
- Suborder: Pleocyemata
- Infraorder: Brachyura
- Family: Grapsidae
- Genus: Metopograpsus
- Species: M. messor

Binomial name
- Metopograpsus messor (Forsskål, 1775)

Synonyms
- Cancer messor Forsskål, 1775; Eurycarcinus messor (Forsskål, 1775); Grapsus gaimardi Audouin, 1826; Grapsus messor H. Milne-Edwards, 1837; Grapsus aethiopicus Hilgendorf, 1869

= Metopograpsus messor =

Species of crab

Metopograpsus messor is a species of grapsid crab that lives in mangroves from East Africa to Fiji.

== Description ==
It grows up to 30 millimetres (1.2 in) wide. The carapace and legs are mottled brownish green, while the claws are brownish red.

== Distribution ==
The distribution of M. messor extends from East Africa, along the coast of the Indian Ocean, including the Red Sea and the Persian Gulf, and at least as far east as Fiji. Knowledge of its distribution has been clouded by confusion between M. messor and M. thukuhar, which can only be told apart by detailed examination, but there are reports of M. messor as far east as the Hawaiian Islands.

== Ecology ==
Metopograpsus messor lives in mangroves (including Avicennia marina and Sonneratia alba), as well as on rocky shores. It lives under rotting wood, and is capable of climbing trees.

== Taxonomic history ==
Metopograpsus messor was first described under the name Cancer messor by Peter Forsskål in 1775, in his Descriptiones Animalium, Avium, Amphibiorum, Piscium, Insectorum, Vermium, based on material he collected at Suez.
