= Goniopsis cruentata =

- Goniopsis cruentata side view

Scientific classification
- Kingdom: Animalia
- Phylum: Arthropoda
- Clade: Pancrustacea
- Class: Malacostraca
- Order: Decapoda
- Suborder: Pleocyemata
- Infraorder: Brachyura
- Family: Grapsidae
- Genus: Goniopsis
- Species: G. cruentata

Binomial name
- Goniopsis cruentata (Latreille, 1803)

Synonyms
- Grapsus (Goniopsis) cruentata Latreille, 1803; Grapsus cruentatus Latreille, 1803; Grapsus longipes Randall, 1840

Species of crab

Side view emphasizing leg bristles

Front view

Goniopsis cruentata, the mangrove root crab, is a species of crab native to tropical and subtropical coastal areas of the Atlantic Ocean, both in the Americas and Africa. It belongs to the family Grapsidae.

== Description ==
Here are key identification features of Goniopsis cruentata:

- Carapaces are quadrangular, somewhat flat on the front, with large white spots at the edges, and short eye stalks which are reddish. Carapaces are up to 6.59 cm (2 5/8 in) in diameter. Males have larger carapaces than females, though female carapaces have wider rear ends.
- Legs are reddish with dark spots, and bearing conspicuous bristles.
- Claws, or chelae, are red except for the palms, which are almost white, and the fingers, which are yellow.

Juvenile Goniopsis cruentata easily can be confused with other species.

== Distribution ==
In the Americas, Goniopsis cruentata occurs along the coasts as far north as southern Florida in the USA, and the state of São Paulo in Brazil, in between including the Caribbean and Gulf of Mexico. Along the African coast it occurs from Senegal to northern Angola.

== Habitat ==
Goniopsis cruentata lives in tropical and subtropical mangrove habitats ranging from muddy banks, swamps and sandy soil between the mangrove trees' prop roots and trunks, plus on the roots themselves, and thus can be considered semi-arboreal. The crabs are active both day and night. In Barbados they occur in crevices of limestone derived from coral formations and in semi-dry mudflat areas.

When climbing among prop roots of Florida's Red Mangroves, Goniopsis cruentata has been observed as high as 3.7 m (12 ft). When among the roots if they feel threatened they drop into the water or hide in the burrow of a land crab.

== Ecology ==
Crabs in the family Grapsidae, such as Goniopsis cruentata, by consuming such large quantities of mangrove leaf litter, often serve as primary consumers. Thus, in the context of the Carbon Cycle of the mangrove ecosystem, they may be the main processors of mangrove carbon. This breaking down of leaves into tiny particles by digestion encourages microbial colonization and further biodegradation of organic matter, in support of the mangrove ecosystem's nutrient cycle.

Also Goniopsis cruentata plays an important role in propagule predation, and may affect Mangrove recruitment and community composition. Habitat destruction along with long-term overfishing of the species can have irreversible consequences affecting the entire mangrove ecosystem. Goniopsis cruentata are predators known to hunt fiddler crabs and Mangrove Tree Crabs

== Behavior ==
The right (slimmer) claw, or chela, is used for food handling, while the left (more robust) chela is for breaking down exoskeletons of smaller crabs and other foods.

Mainly Goniopsis cruentata is solitary, keeping a distance of around 30 cm (12 in) from other crabs. To defend themselves, they hold out their claws to the attacker. They are very fast and agile, thus hard to catch.

During courtship, males wave their bright claws. Since females may see larger males as their best partners, a good guess is that the largest, brightest, most vigorously waved claws are the most attractive to females.

== As human food ==
In northeastern Brazil, Goniopsis cruentata usually is not sold as whole individuals but rather as processed meat, popularly known as catado. Between 120-150 adult crabs are needed to produce 1 kg (2 1/4 lb) of catado, so harvesting the crab for commercial purposes heavily impacts natural populations.

== Taxonomy ==
In 1803 Pierre André Latreille formally described and named Goniopsis cruentata under the basionym Grapsis cruentata. This foundational work by Latreille can be viewed from the perspective that when the description was published in 1803, a very few years earlier Latreille had been suffering prolonged imprisonment during the French Revolution and condemned to certain death through deportation, when his discovery of a rare beetle in his dungeon led to his release.

=== Etymology ===
The genus name Goniopsis derives from the Greek γωνία, meaning "angle", and όψις, meaning "appearance, similar to." Thus, "angled appearance," among species of the genus aptly describing the carapaces' quadrangular forms.

The species name cruentata comes from the first declension of the Latin adjective cruentatus, meaning "bloodstained, besplattered, bloody, bleeding," surely alluding to the species's blood-red claws and legs.
