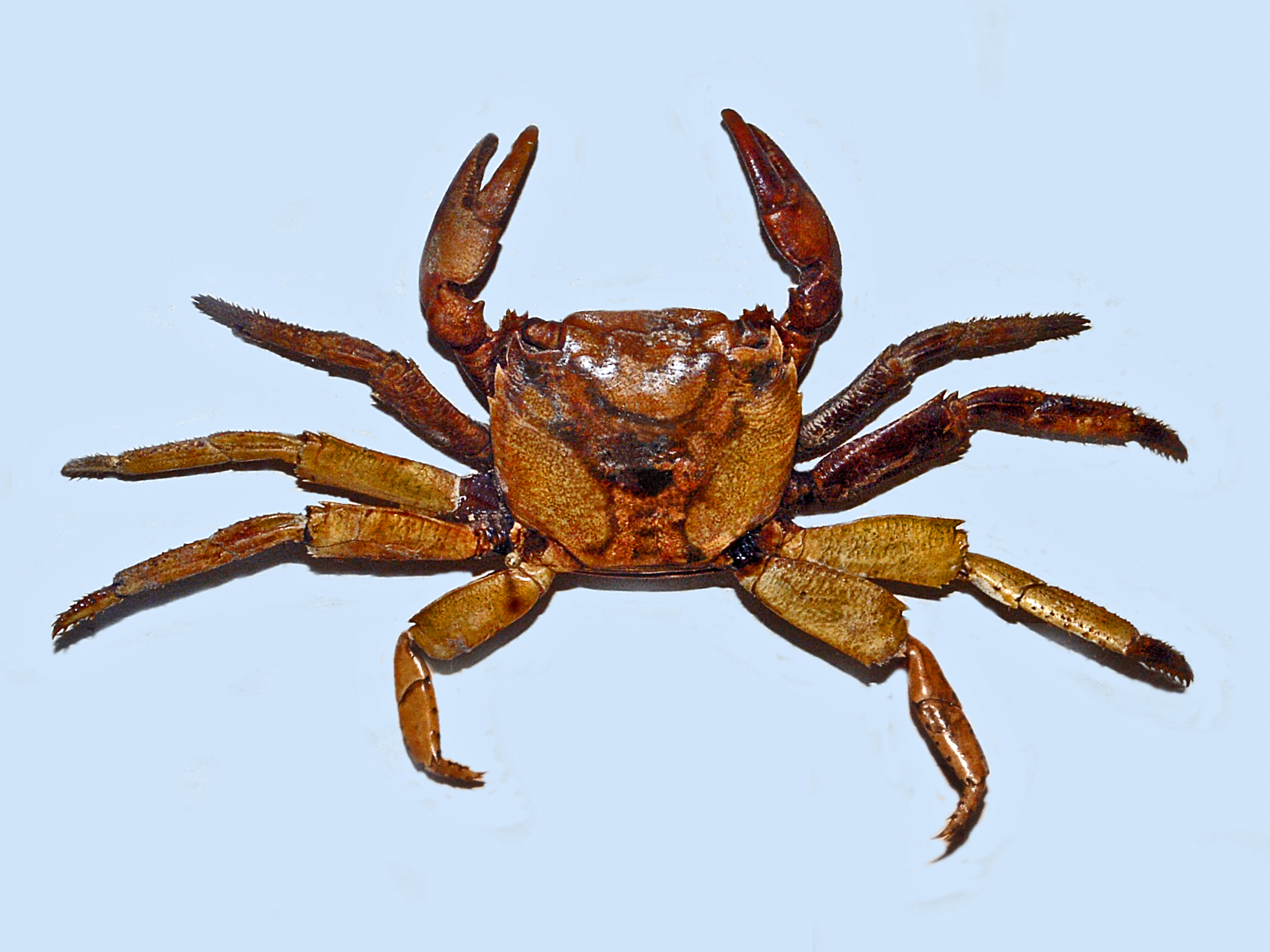

Scientific classification
- Kingdom: Animalia
- Phylum: Arthropoda
- Clade: Pancrustacea
- Class: Malacostraca
- Order: Decapoda
- Suborder: Pleocyemata
- Infraorder: Brachyura
- Family: Grapsidae
- Genus: Geograpsus
- Species: G. lividus

Binomial name
- Geograpsus lividus (H. Milne-Edwards, 1837)

Synonyms
- Grapsus brevipes H. Milne-Edwards, 1853; Orthograpsus hillii Kingsley, 1880; Geograpsus occidentalis Stimpson, 1860

= Geograpsus lividus =

Species of crab

Geograpsus lividus is a species of crab in the family Grapsidae. Little research has been conducted on this species. It was originally classified as belonging to the genus Grapsus; however, this name is no longer used.

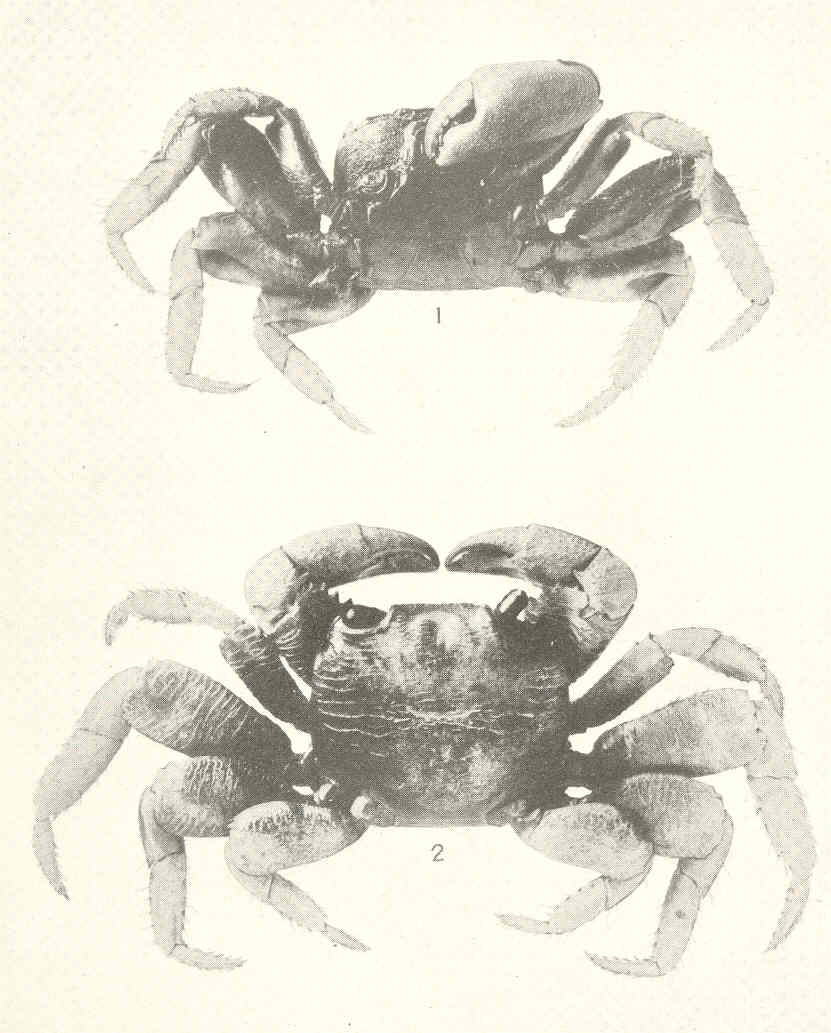
Illustration of Geograpsus lividus from Grapsoid Crabs of America (1918), Rathbun, Mary J.

== Description ==
Megaopae G. lividus can reach a width of about 25–35 mm (0.98–1.38 in). They are yellowish red in color and have distinct hairs on their legs. The cephalothorax is globose, smooth and without tubercles. Chelar tubercles are restricted to the upper half of the chelae, the pincer on the end of the claw. Morphology differs between G. lividus populations in different habitats, particularly when comparing those in the Atlantic and those in the Pacific. Zoeae G. lividus found in the Atlantic possess more outer minute spines on the furcal arms of the telson as well as more aesthetase setae, bristles, on the antennule.

There are eight recognized developmental zoeal stages of G. lividus which take place over the span of at least 60 days, making it the longest-recorded crab developmental pathways. On its way to entering the megalopae, post-larval stage, the larvae undergoes exponential growth rates becoming up to 7200% of its initial biomass which also makes it one of the fastest observed growth rates in the infraorder Brachyura. The largest larvae are from the Gulf of Mexico while the smallest are found in Jamaica.

The ratio of sternum width to posterolateral margin width is larger for males than females.

== Distribution ==
Geograpsus lividus is native to east Africa, the Cook Islands, Hawaii, and the western Atlantic. It is currently present throughout the East Pacific and West Atlantic oceans. Within the Atlantic ocean they are found throughout the Gulf of Mexico and along the coast from Florida to Brazil. It can be found on both coasts of America from the central Gulf to Chile and in the waters near the Galapagos Islands.

== Habitat ==
Although they can live throughout the intertidal zone, they are usually found among rocks and stones and in the high tide and splash zones. They are considered a supratidal species as they tend to occupy the upper region of the intertidal, residing in sediments deposited by extreme tides. They are most likely to be found deep in moist rock crevices and in accumulations of debris slightly above sea level.

== Behavior ==
Few behavioral patterns have been tracked in G. lividus, but they are fast swimmers and can be difficult to catch when chased. Since they are a nocturnal species, they take refuge terrestrially during the day and are active primarily during the night.

== Diet ==
While the specific diet of G. lividus has not yet been investigated, other members of the Geograpsus genus including G. grayi and G. crinipes are carnivorous. They are able to tear through shell as well as softer substances using flattened lateral teeth and a rounded medial tooth in the center of their mouth. They are known to mostly prey on other invertebrates including, but not limited to, insects and other smaller arthropods. They hunt at night and tend to stay near the water line.

== Reproduction ==
Geograpsus lividus utilizes indirect sperm transfer; some form of precopulatory mating ritual has also been observed. Since the species is nocturnal, larvae are released at night in their first zoeal stage. They produce coenospermy spermatophores that range from approximately 19.1 to 41.3 micrometers. Coenospermy is a common characteristic of marine decapods.
