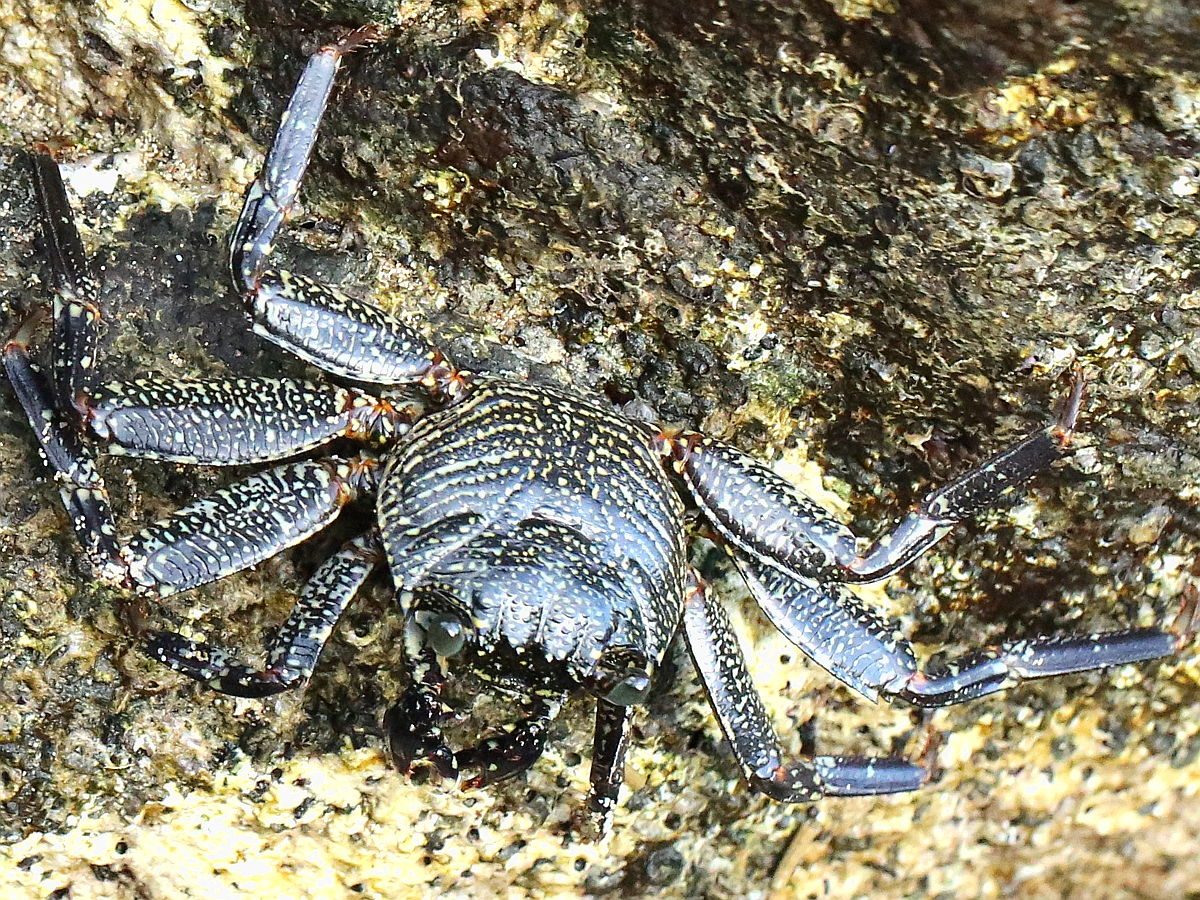

Scientific classification
- Kingdom: Animalia
- Phylum: Arthropoda
- Clade: Pancrustacea
- Class: Malacostraca
- Order: Decapoda
- Suborder: Pleocyemata
- Infraorder: Brachyura
- Family: Grapsidae
- Genus: Grapsus
- Species: G. tenuicrustatus

Binomial name
- Grapsus tenuicrustatus (Herbst, 1783)

= Grapsus tenuicrustatus =

Species of crab

Grapsus tenuicrustatus in Hawaii

Grapsus tenuicrustatus, commonly known as thin-shelled rock crab or Natal lightfoot crab, is a species of decapod crustacean in the family Grapsidae.

The English common name natal sally-light-foot crab has been applied to the species by the FAO, and as the synonym Grapsus grapsus tenuicrustatus suggests, it had sometimes been classified as a subspecies of the sally-lightfoot.

== Description and biology ==
Grapsus tenuicrustatus can be characterized by its deep purple to black carapace and many light colored markings while it is alive. However, as individuals shed their shell or die, the carapace the thin-shelled rock crab leaves behind turns a bright red-orangey color. The species goes by various names in different cultures. The Hawaiian name for the species is a'ama. In the Philippines they are known as Katang. Fully grown, the thin-shelled rock crab can reach lengths of 6-8 centimeters. The males of the species tend to be smaller in size compared to their female counterparts. Their lifespan in the wild is uncertain, but has been shown to be 7-10 years in captivity.

== Habitat and distribution ==
The thin-shelled rock crab can be normally be found among rocky outcrops that allow for a safe place to escape to when there are signs of danger. The range of the Grapsus tenuicrustatus is listed as Indo-Pacific, found near beaches and tidepools along the shore.

== Human use ==
=== Culinary ===
The thin-shelled rock crab is sought after as a food source in many different cultures. In the Philippines, they are caught and put through a fermentation process and have their roe harvested. Across the Pacific, the people of Hawai'i ate the crabs raw and lightly salted when the seas were rough.
