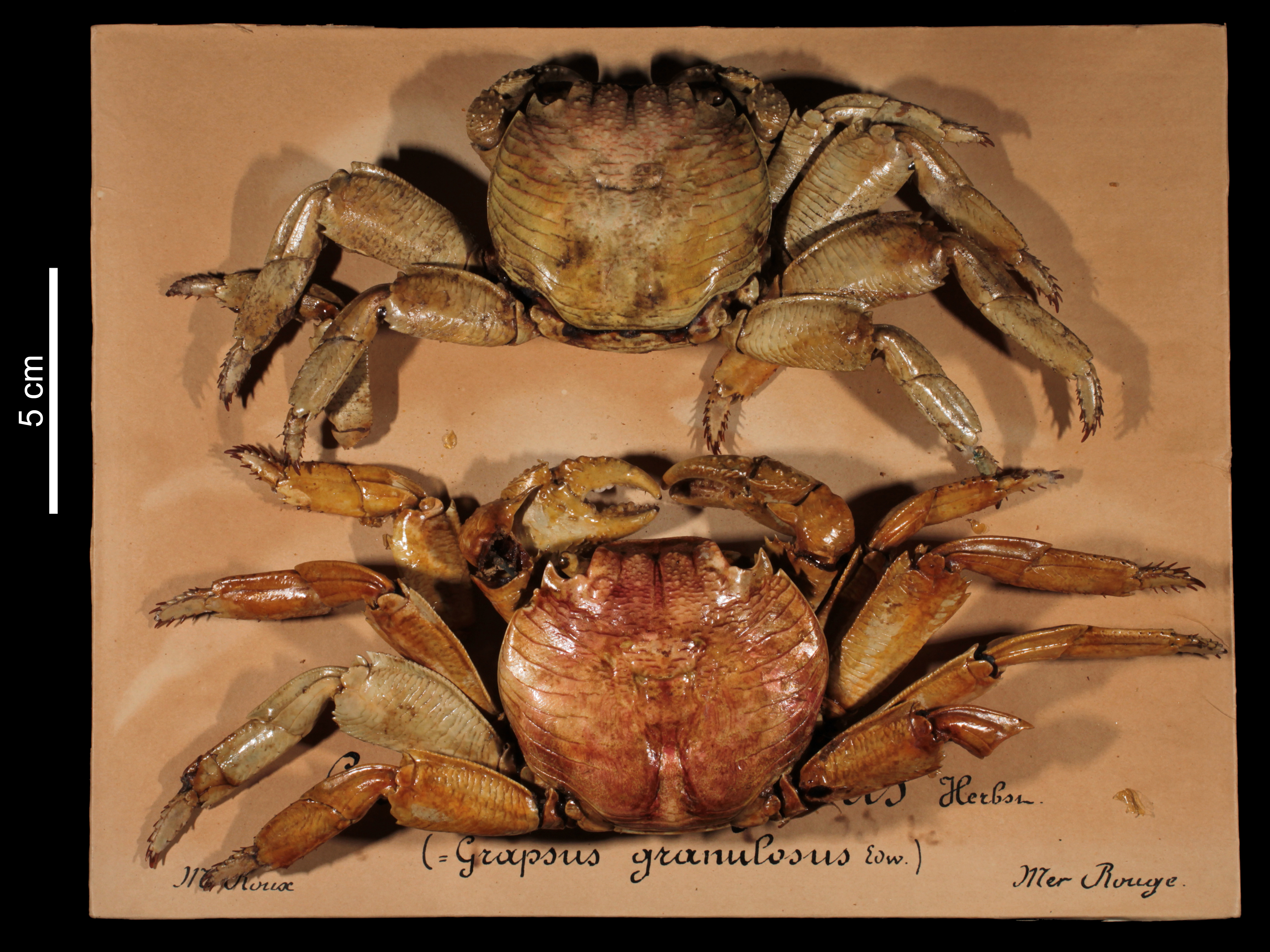

Scientific classification
- Kingdom: Animalia
- Phylum: Arthropoda
- Class: Malacostraca
- Order: Decapoda
- Suborder: Pleocyemata
- Infraorder: Brachyura
- Family: Grapsidae
- Genus: Grapsus
- Species: G. granulosus

Binomial name
- Grapsus granulosus (Milne-Edwards, Annales des Sciences Naturelles 1853)

= Grapsus granulosus =

Species of crab

Grapsus granulosus is a species in the Grapsidae family of crabs. It is commonly found off the coasts of Israel, Jordan and Egypt, but has also been sighted in Oman, Djibouti and Socotra, which is part of Yemen.
