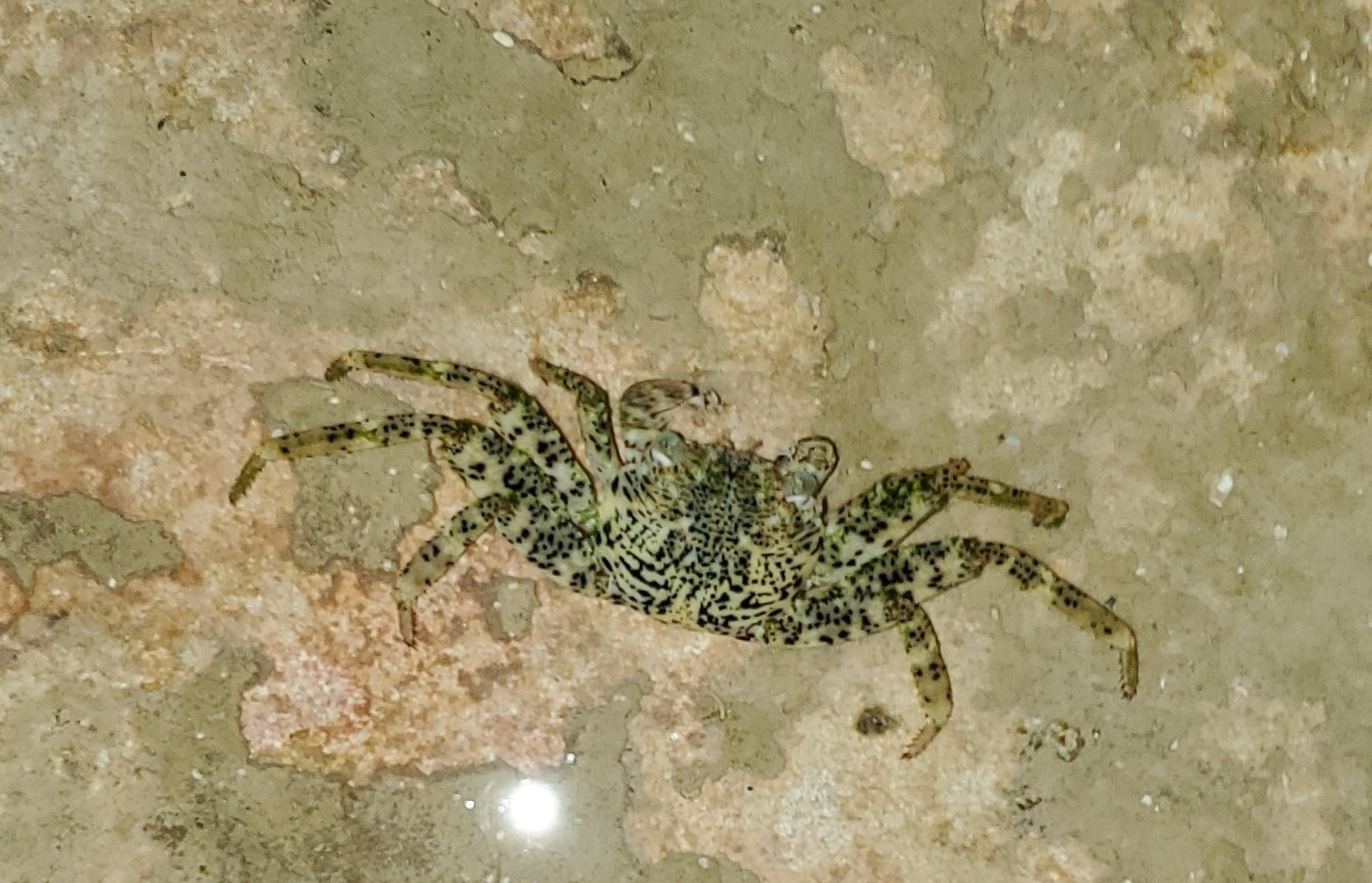

Scientific classification
- Kingdom: Animalia
- Phylum: Arthropoda
- Clade: Pancrustacea
- Class: Malacostraca
- Order: Decapoda
- Suborder: Pleocyemata
- Infraorder: Brachyura
- Family: Grapsidae
- Genus: Grapsus
- Species: G. longitarsis

Binomial name
- Grapsus longitarsis Dana, 1851

= Grapsus longitarsis =

Species of crab

Grapsus longitarsis, also known as the long-legged rock crab, is a species of shore crab in the family Grapsidae. It was first described in 1851 by the American zoologist James Dwight Dana. This species occurs throughout the tropical Indo-Pacific, including Hawai'i, Tuamotu Archipelago, the Cook Islands, and has been recorded in regions such as Indonesia, and the coast of Somalia.

== Description ==
Grapsus longitarsis is a medium-sized crab with an adult carapace width of approximately 32–33 mm and a length of 25–29 mm. The species is physically distinguished from others in its genus by having lateral margins of the carapace that are nearly straight. The body coloration is typically pale yellow and is often marked with small reddish-brown spots. Its walking legs are notably elongated, which is a key characteristic of the species. The fingers of the claws are darker in color and feature "spooned" tips used for feeding.

== Distribution and habitat ==
Grapsus longitarsis is widely distributed throughout the tropical Indo-Pacific region. The species is native to several island chains, including Hawai'i, Tuamotu Archipelago, and the Cook Islands. It is also commonly found in the waters around Indonesia. Records of the species extend as far west as the coast of Somalia in the Indian Ocean. This crab typically inhabits high-energy coastal environments, such as wave-exposed rocky shorelines. It is a benthic species usually found in the intertidal zone at depths of 0-5 meters. During low tide, the crab is often observed within tidal pools.
