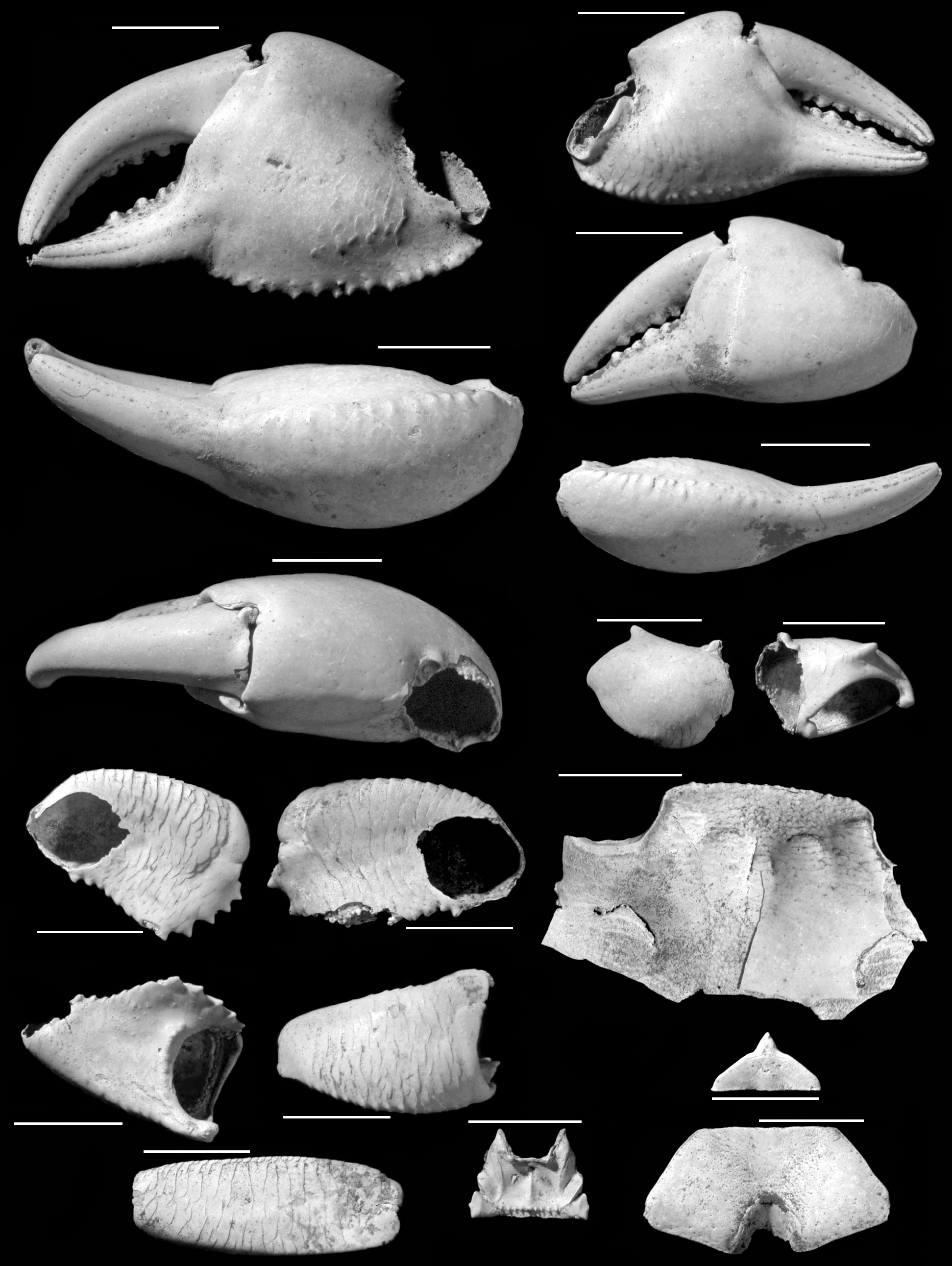
- Holotype; scale bar is 10 mm

Scientific classification
- Kingdom: Animalia
- Phylum: Arthropoda
- Class: Malacostraca
- Order: Decapoda
- Suborder: Pleocyemata
- Infraorder: Brachyura
- Family: Grapsidae
- Genus: Geograpsus
- Species: †G. severnsi

Binomial name
- †Geograpsus severnsi Paulay & Starmer, 2011

= Geograpsus severnsi =

Geograpsus severnsi Temporal range: Holocene

Extinct species of crab

Geograpsus severnsi is an extinct species of land crab from Hawaii. It died out shortly after humans colonized the Hawaiian Islands. It is the first known documented crab to become extinct after the ice age.

== Distribution ==
Specimens of G. severnsi have been recovered from several of the Hawaiian volcanic islands, including Hawaiʻi, Maui, Oʻahu and Kauaʻi. They have been found up to 2 km (1.2 mi) inland, and at altitudes of up to 950 m (3,120 ft). Its range appears to have overlapped with that of the more coastal G. crinipes, a species which is widespread across the Indo-Pacific.

== Description ==
Geograpsus severnsi was probably the largest species in the genus. Based on the size of sternites, its carapace width may have been up to 66 mm (2.6 in). Its claws were 20–49 mm (0.8–1.9 in) long, and in all the specimens with both claws preserved, the right claw was larger than the left. Most of the known specimens are males, but this is thought to reflect behavioral differences between the sexes, rather than an extreme sex ratio in the population. This is also seen in the Ascension Island species Johngarthia lagostoma, where females are likely to die on their reproductive migration. It is therefore likely that G. severnsi had a similar ecology to other land crabs. It would have been an omnivore and a predator, possibly feeding on insects, land snails and bird's eggs. Outside the genus Geograpsus, there are no truly terrestrial crabs in Hawaii; the only well documented species is Chiromantes obtusifrons, which may move up to 50 m (160 ft) inland, at elevations up to 10 m (33 ft).

== Systematics ==
Geograpsus severnsi is one of five species in the genus Geograpsus. Its closest relative appears to be G. grayi, a species found from the western Indian Ocean to the Line Islands and Marshall Islands. G. severnsi has been known to Hawaiian zoologists since the mid-1970s, but was only formally described in 2011. The specific epithet severnsi commemorates Mike Severns, the discoverer of the cave which housed most of the remains.
