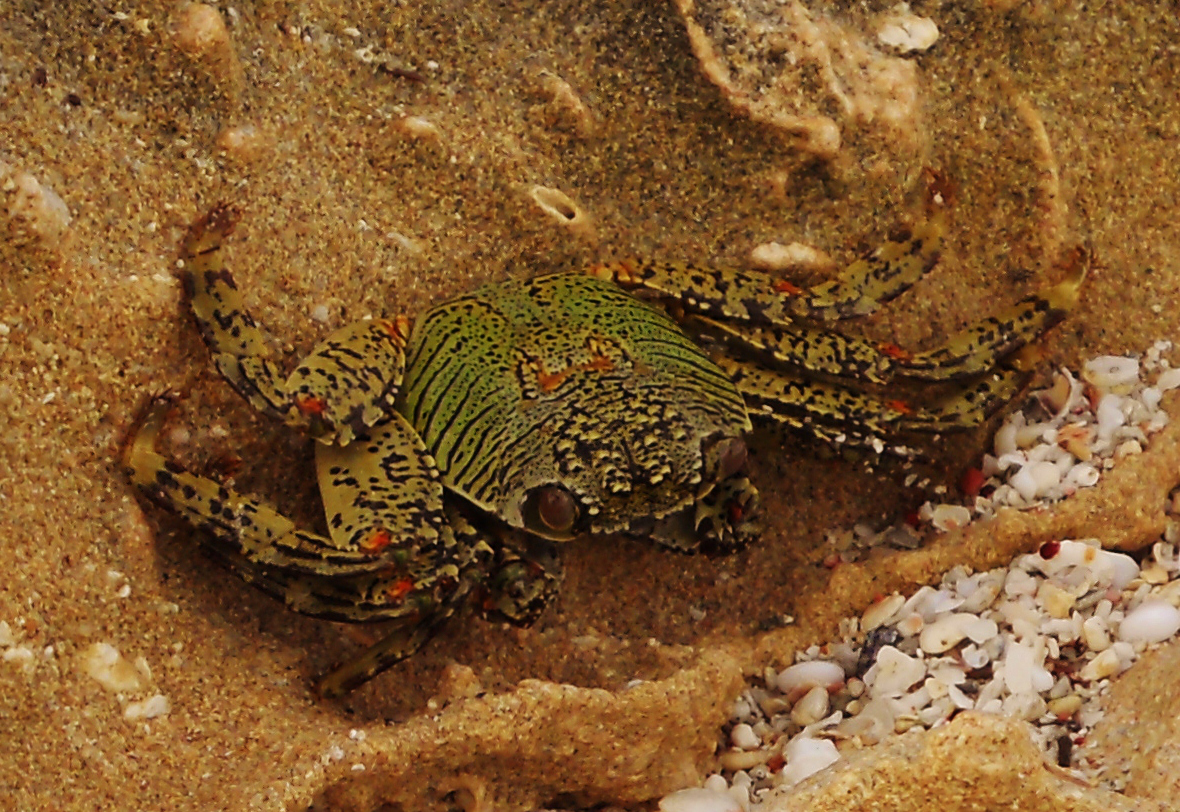

Scientific classification
- Kingdom: Animalia
- Phylum: Arthropoda
- Class: Malacostraca
- Order: Decapoda
- Suborder: Pleocyemata
- Infraorder: Brachyura
- Family: Grapsidae
- Genus: Grapsus
- Species: G. albolineatus

Binomial name
- Grapsus albolineatus Latreille in Milbert, 1812

Synonyms
- Cancer strigosus Herbst, 1799; Grapsus (Goniopsis) flavipes MacLeay, 1838; Grapsus albolineatus Lamarck, 1818; Grapsus longipes Stimpson, 1858; Grapsus peroni Milne-Edwards, 1853; Grapsus strigosus Herbst, 1799

= Grapsus albolineatus =

Species of crab

Grapsus albolineatus, also called the mottled crab or mottled lightfoot crab, is a species of decapod crustacean in the family Grapsidae, native to the Indo-Pacific.

== Description ==
Its carapace, or upper shell, is flat, circular, and rough with arched lateral margins, and may be up to 37 mm in length. Its chelae, or claws, are short, small, and flattened. Its pereiopods, or legs, are long with a tapered end. The margin of the inferior extremity of its last pair of legs is serrate. Males have bigger claws than females. This species is red, blue, or green in color. Its legs are the same color and have irregular dark-brown mottling.

== Habitat and distribution ==
This species occurs in rocky depths and in coral reefs. It is found in the Indo-Pacific from the East African coast to the Chilean coast. This includes the waters of the Red Sea, the Gulf of Aqaba, India, Indonesia, Pakistan, Japan, Australia, and the tropical islands of the Pacific Ocean (such as Hawaii).

== Diet ==
The species is herbivorous, preferring filamentous to foliose algae.

== Reproduction ==
Like in most other true crabs, light and temperature are the main environmental factors that determine reproductive activity. The female releases her fertilized eggs in its abdomen. This species has a long planktonic larval phase. As the larva matures, it undergoes a series of molts that allow it to grow and reach maturity.

== Gallery ==
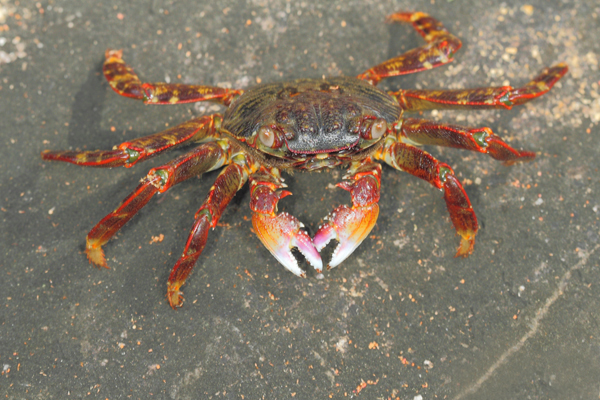
At Karwar, Karnataka, India

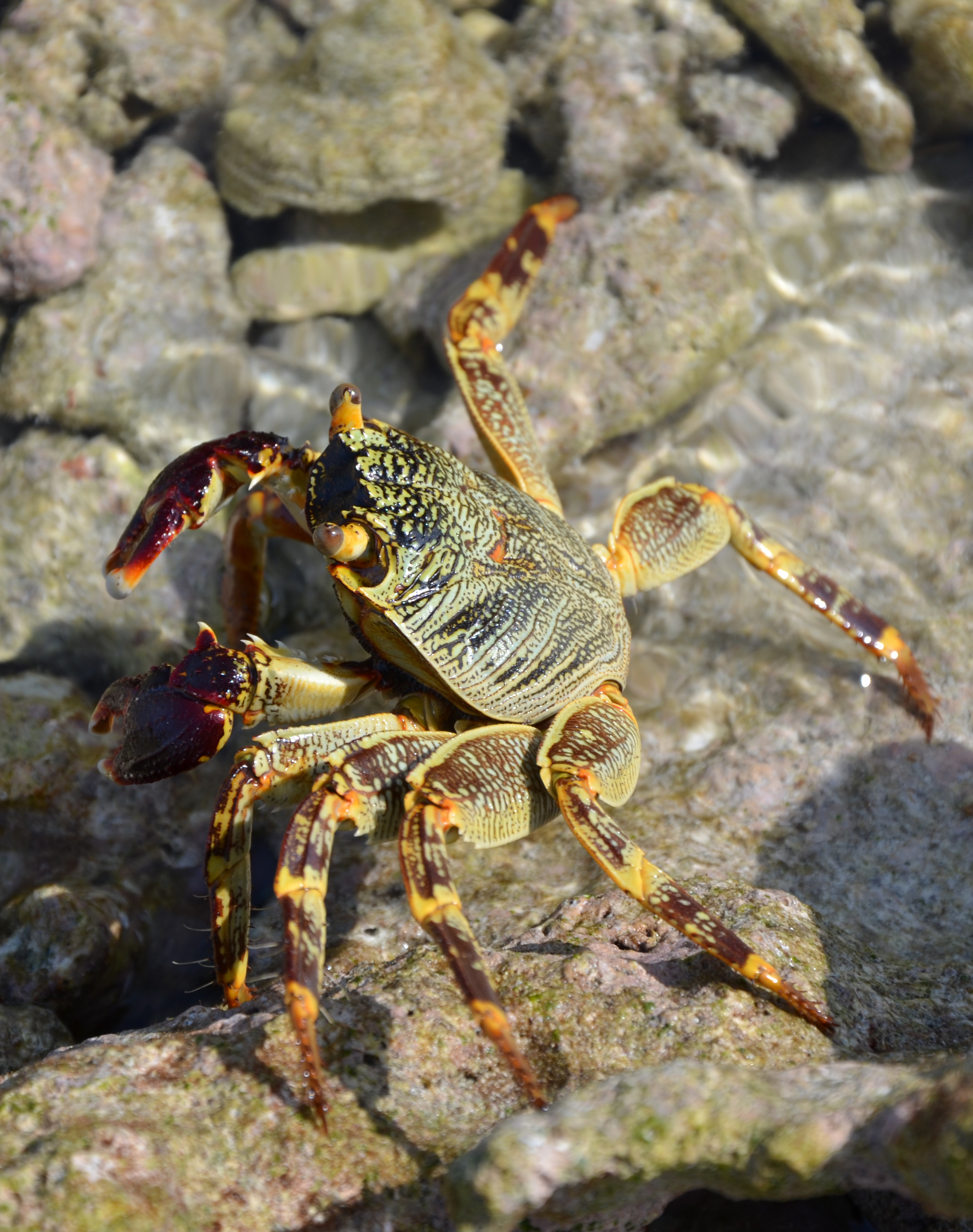
At Bathala, Maldives

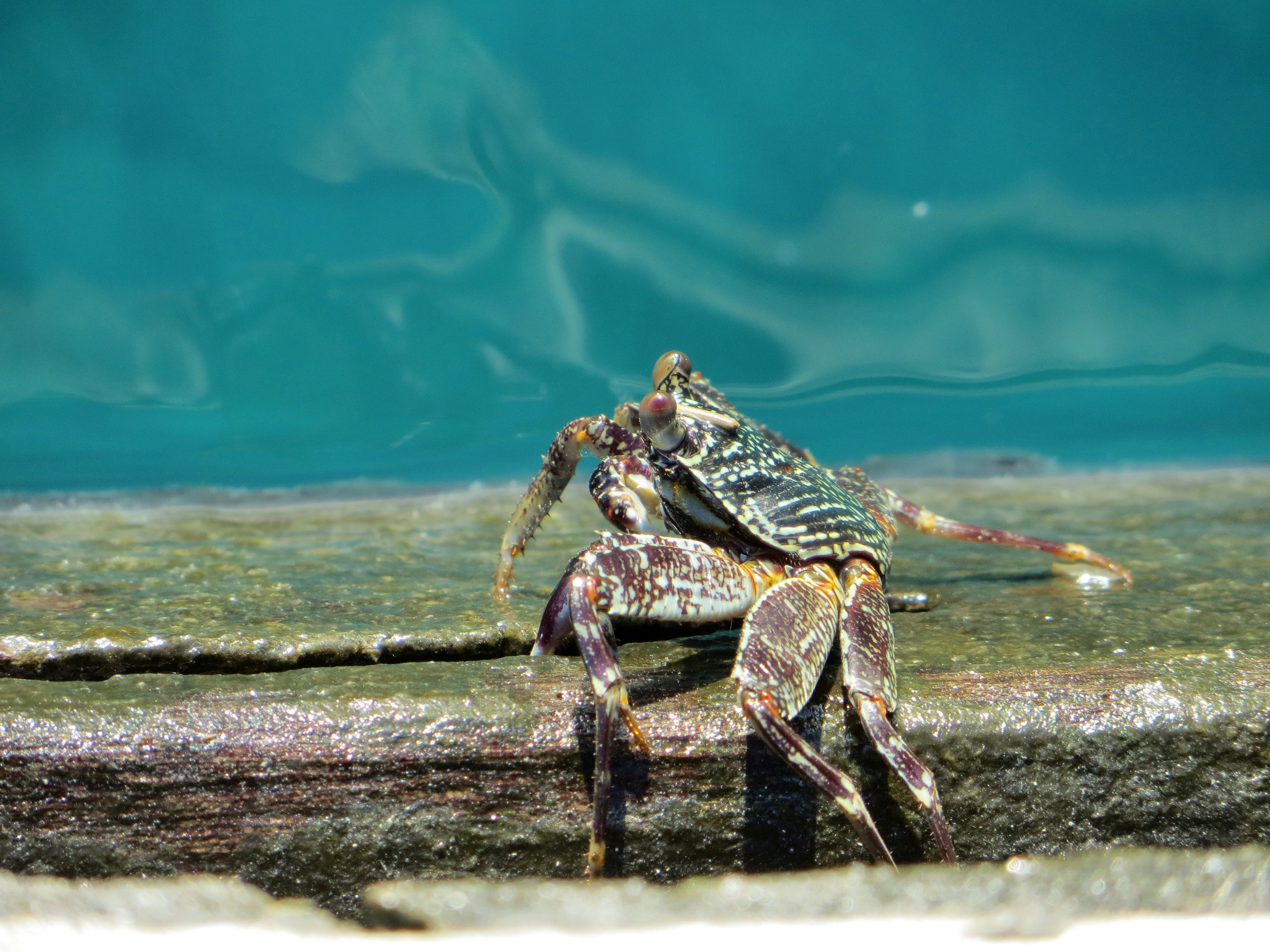
On the Baa Atoll
