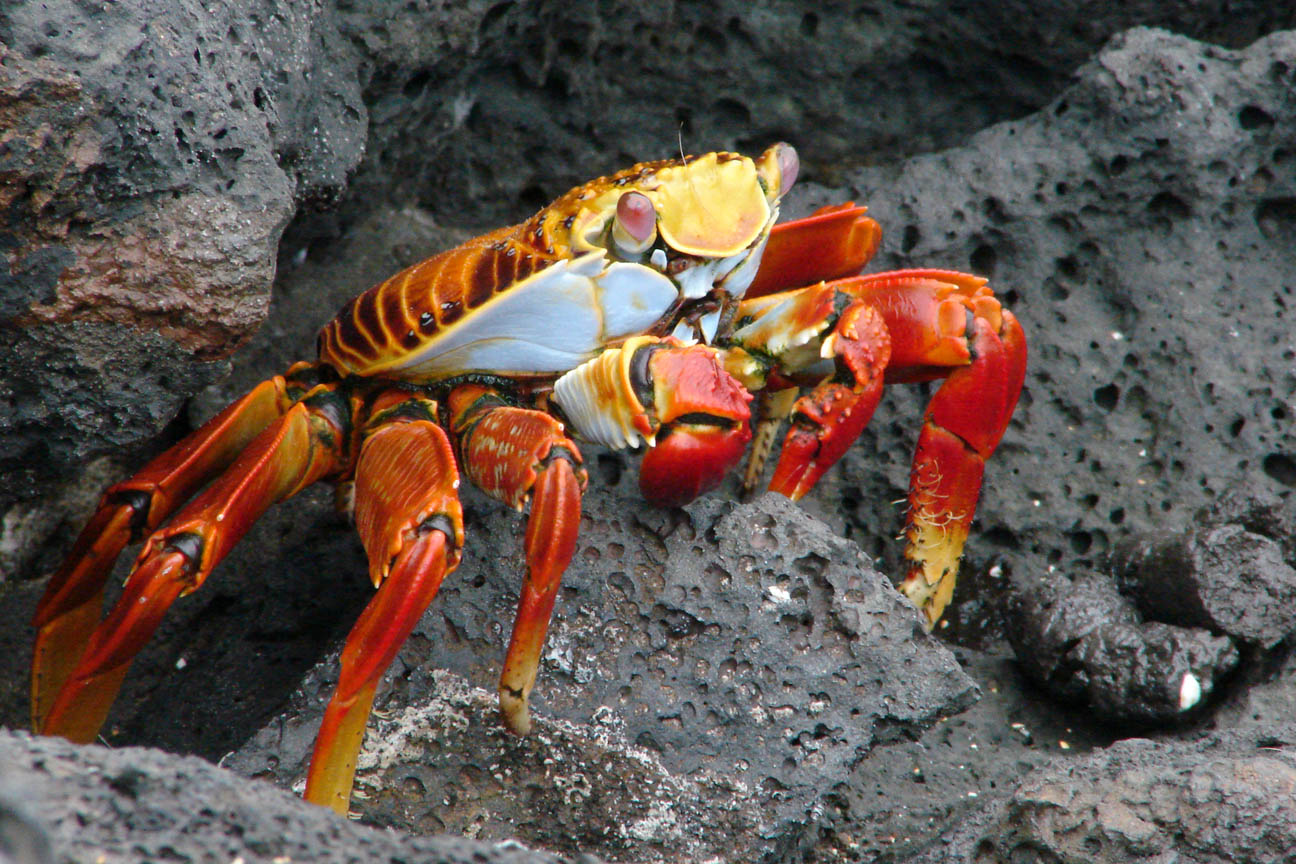
- "Sally Lightfoot", Grapsus grapsus

Scientific classification
- Kingdom: Animalia
- Phylum: Arthropoda
- Class: Malacostraca
- Order: Decapoda
- Suborder: Pleocyemata
- Infraorder: Brachyura
- Family: Grapsidae
- Subfamily: Grapsinae
- Genus: Grapsus; Lamarck, 1801

Type species
- Cancer grapsus Linnaeus, 1758

= Grapsus =

Genus of crabs

Grapsus is a genus of lightfoot crabs, comprising the following species:

- Grapsus albolineatus Latreille in Milbert, 1812
- Grapsus adscensionis (Osbeck, 1765)
- Grapsus fourmanoiri Crosnier, 1965
- Grapsus grapsus (Linnaeus, 1758)
- Grapsus granulosus Milne-Edwards, 1853
- Grapsus intermedius De Man, 1888
- Grapsus longitarsis Dana, 1851
- Grapsus tenuicrustatus (Herbst, 1783)

'Grapsus' is a New Latin modification of Greek 'grapsaios' meaning 'crab'.

== Gallery ==
Grapsus tenuicrustatus climbing on rocks in Hawaii

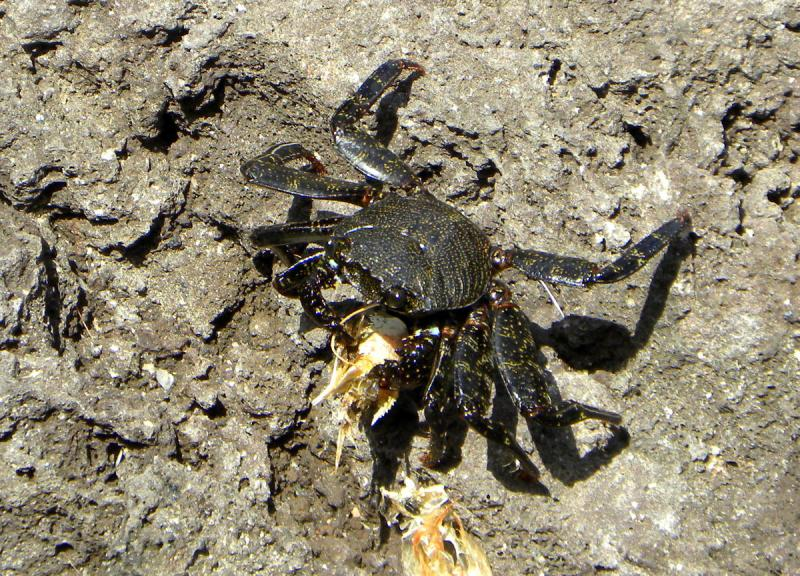
Grapsus adscensionis at Tenerife

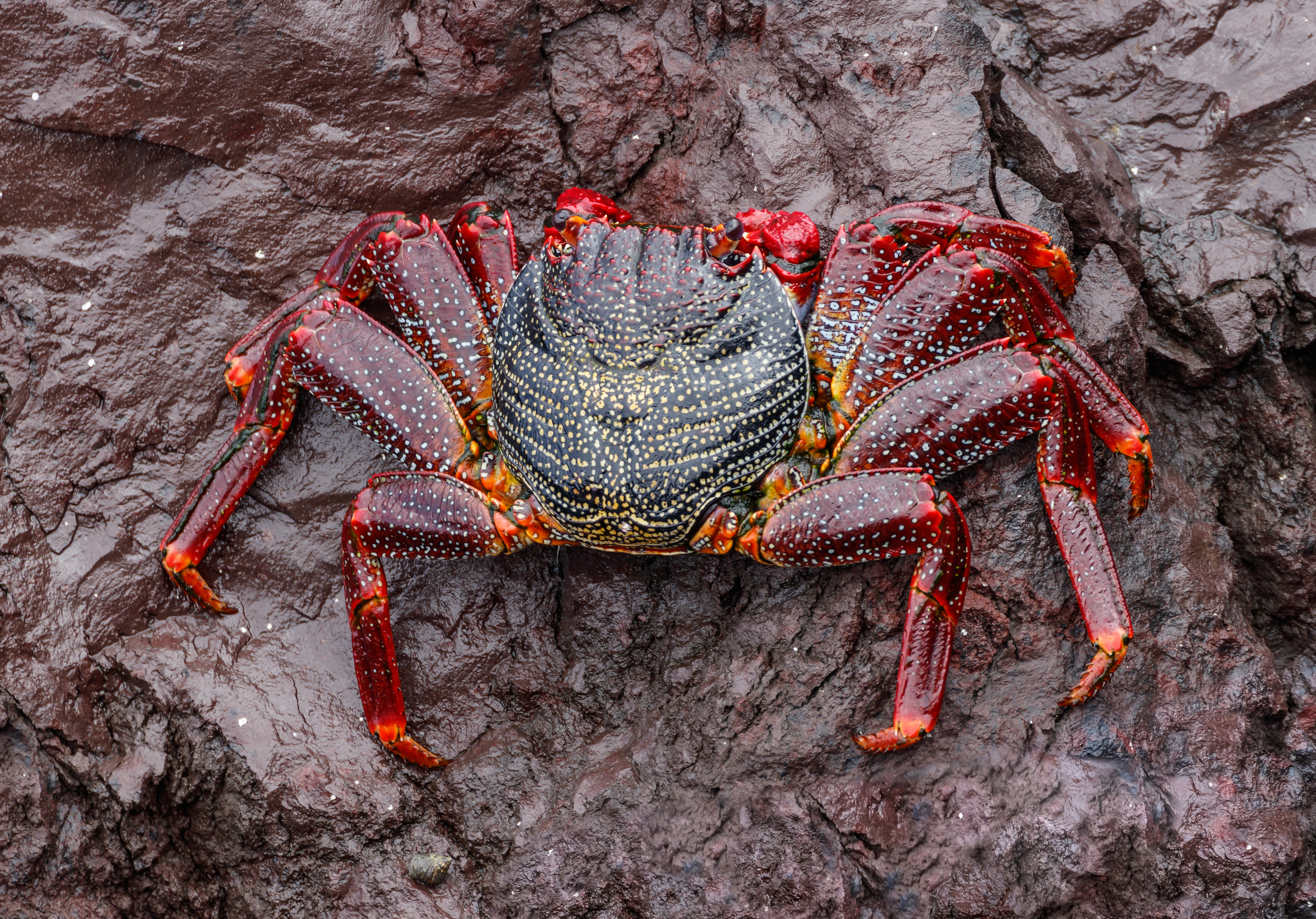
Grapsus adscensionis at Tenerife

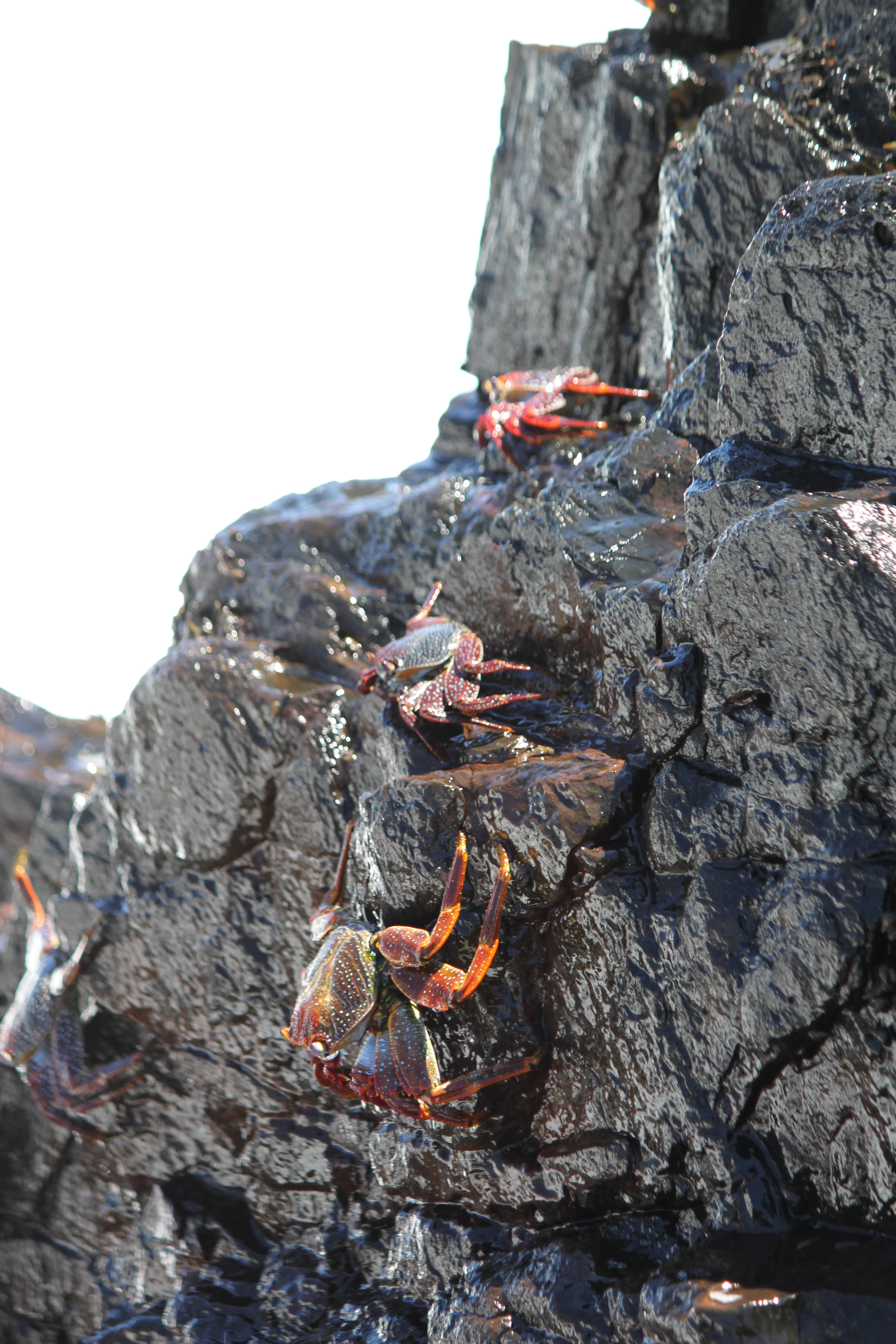
Grapsus adscensionis at Saint Helena

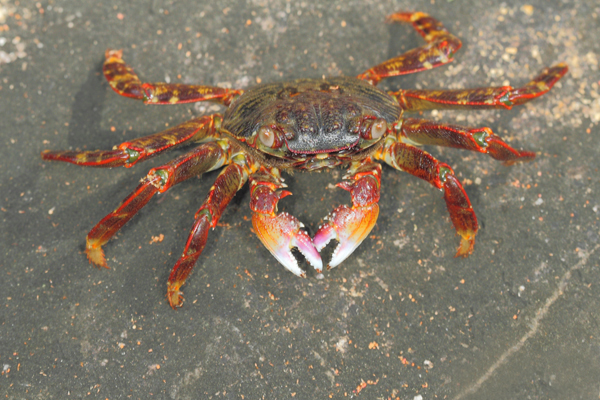
Grapsus albolineatus at Karwar, India

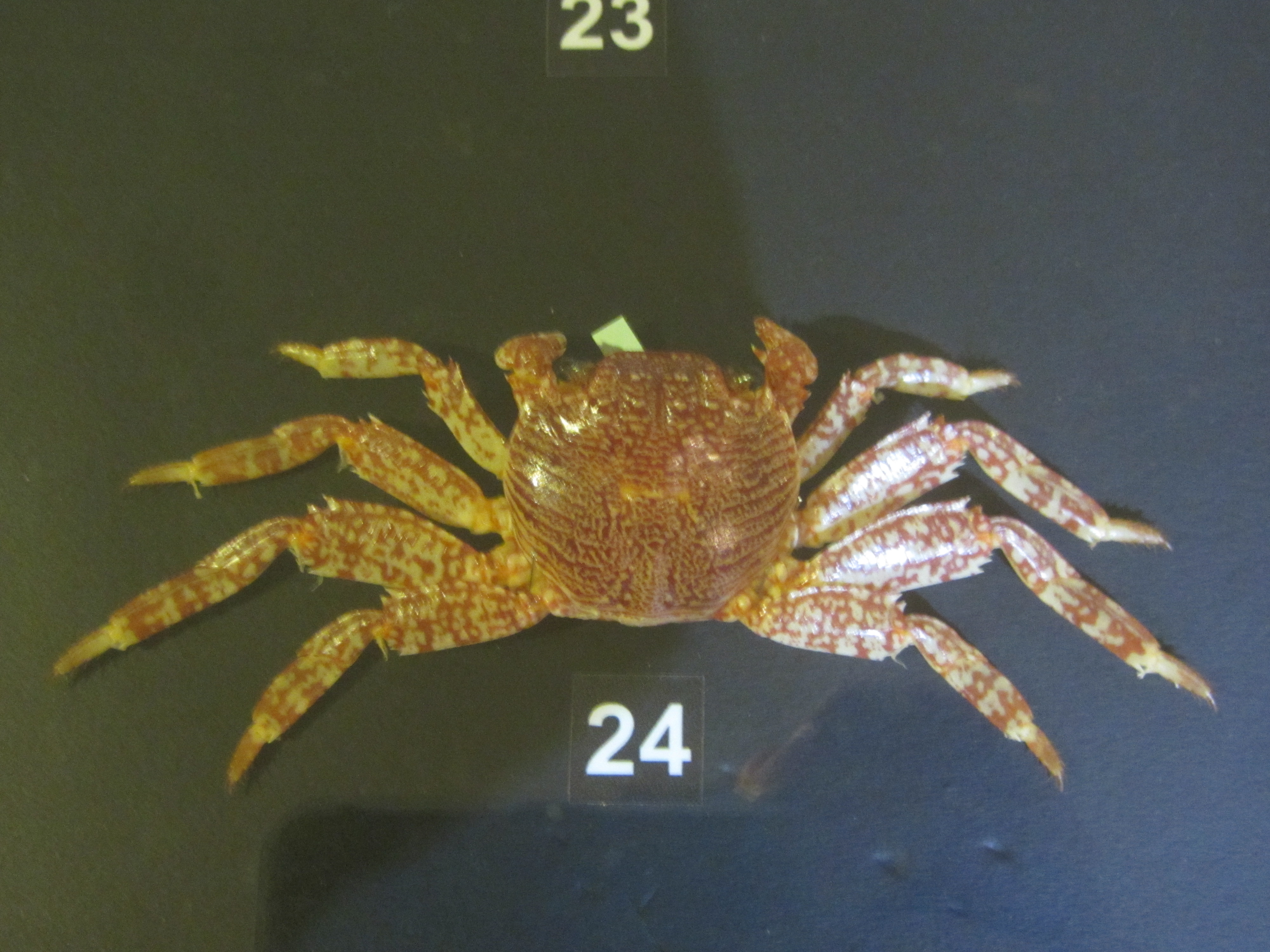
Grapsus tenuicrustatus
