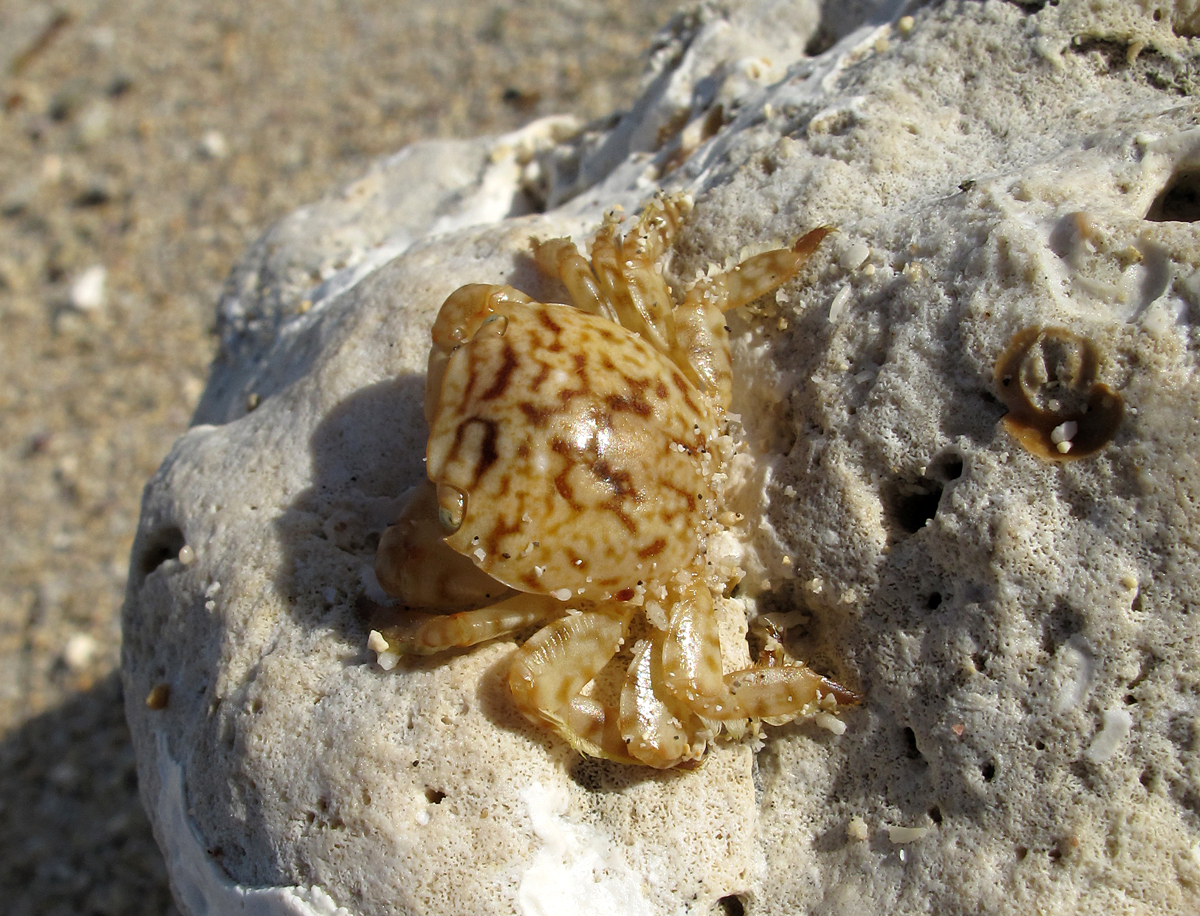
- Planes minutus

Scientific classification
- Kingdom: Animalia
- Phylum: Arthropoda
- Clade: Pancrustacea
- Class: Malacostraca
- Order: Decapoda
- Suborder: Pleocyemata
- Infraorder: Brachyura
- Family: Grapsidae
- Genus: Planes; Bowdich, 1825

Type species
- Planes clypeatus Bowdich, 1825

Species
- Planes minutus (Linnaeus, 1758); Planes marinus Rathbun, 1914; Planes major (MacLeay, 1838)

Synonyms
- Nautilograpsus H. Milne Edwards, 1837

= Planes (crab) =

Planes Temporal range: Middle Miocene–Recent

Genus of crabs

Planes is a genus of crabs in the family Grapsidae that currently comprises three extant species: Planes minutus (Linnaeus, 1758), Planes marinus Rathbun, 1914, and Planes major (=cyaneus) (MacLeay, 1838). A further fossil species is known from the Middle Miocene of the Caucasus.
