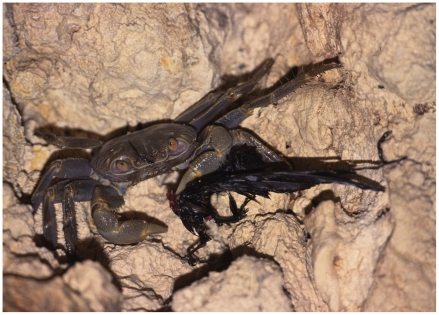
- Geograpsus crinipes

Scientific classification
- Kingdom: Animalia
- Phylum: Arthropoda
- Class: Malacostraca
- Order: Decapoda
- Suborder: Pleocyemata
- Infraorder: Brachyura
- Family: Grapsidae
- Genus: Geograpsus; Stimpson, 1858

Type species
- Grapsus lividus H. Milne-Edwards, 1837

= Geograpsus =

Genus of crabs

Geograpsus is a genus of crabs in the family Grapsidae, containing four extant species, and one extinct species:

- Geograpsus crinipes (Dana, 1851)
- Geograpsus grayi (H. Milne-Edwards, 1853)
- Geograpsus lividus (H. Milne-Edwards, 1837)
- Geograpsus stormi De Man, 1895
- † Geograpsus severnsi Paulay & Starmer, 2011
