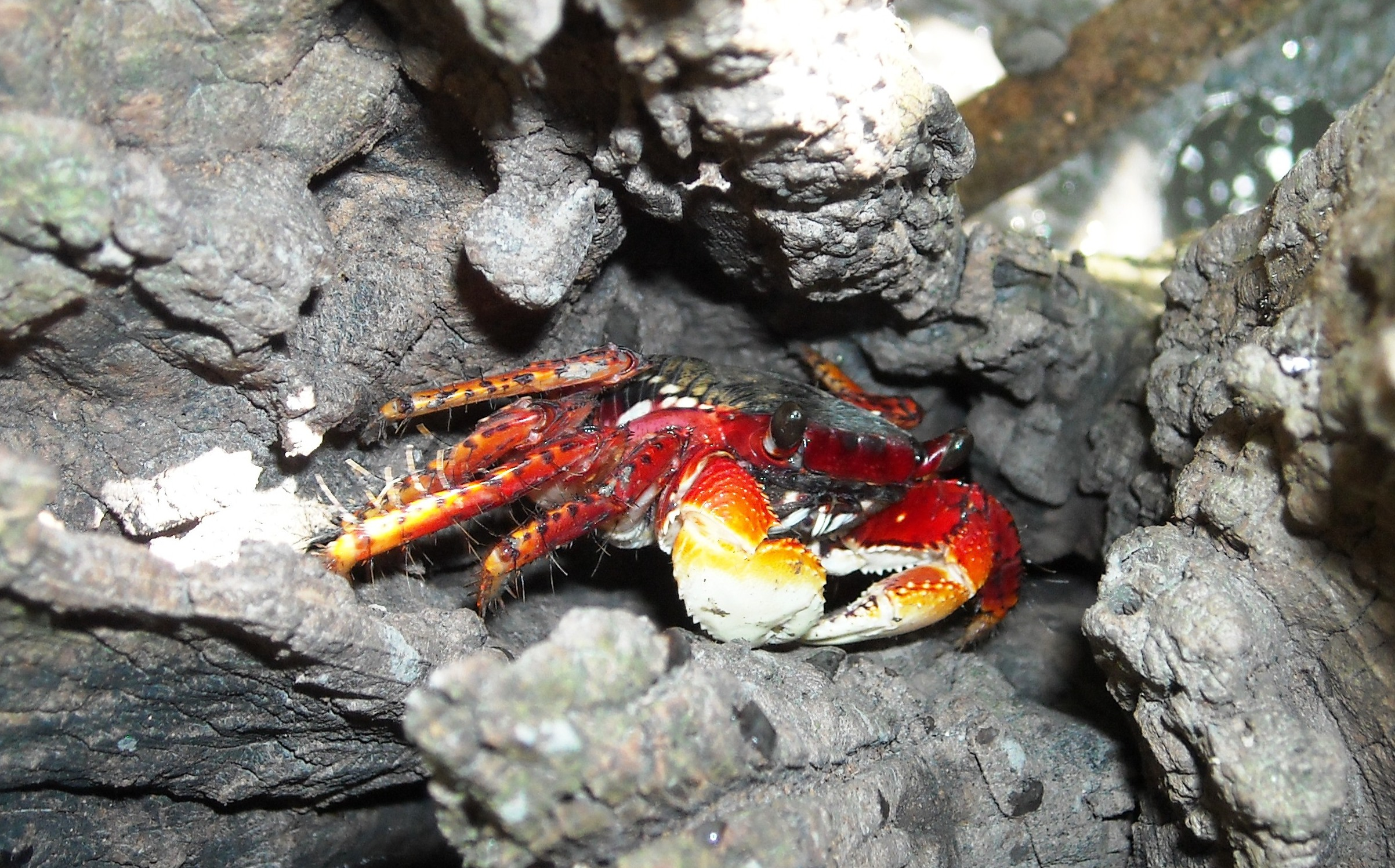
- Goniopsis cruentata

Scientific classification
- Kingdom: Animalia
- Phylum: Arthropoda
- Clade: Pancrustacea
- Class: Malacostraca
- Order: Decapoda
- Suborder: Pleocyemata
- Infraorder: Brachyura
- Family: Grapsidae
- Genus: Goniopsis; De Haan, 1833

Type species
- Goniopsis cruentata (Latreille, 1803)

= Goniopsis =

Genus of crabs

Goniopsis is a genus of crabs in the family Grapsidae, containing three extant species found in the Americas and West Africa:

- Goniopsis cruentata (Latreille, 1803)
- Goniopsis pelii (Herklots, 1851)
- Goniopsis pulchra (Lockington, 1877)
