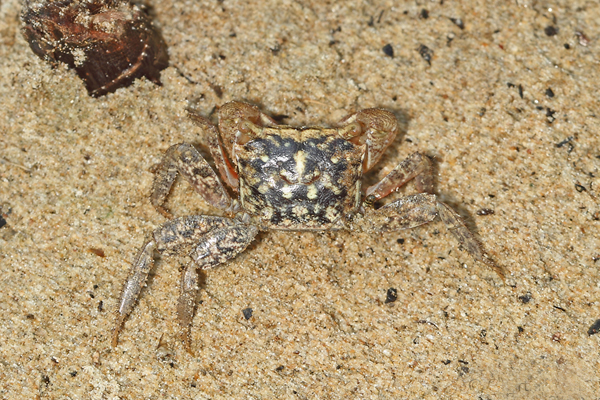
- Metopograpsus messor

Scientific classification
- Kingdom: Animalia
- Phylum: Arthropoda
- Class: Malacostraca
- Order: Decapoda
- Suborder: Pleocyemata
- Infraorder: Brachyura
- Family: Grapsidae
- Genus: Metopograpsus; H. Milne-Edwards, 1853

Type species
- Cancer messor Forsskål, 1775

= Metopograpsus =

Genus of crabs

Metopograpsus is a genus of crabs, containing the following extant species:

- Metopograpsus frontalis Miers, 1880
- Metopograpsus latifrons (White, 1847)
- Metopograpsus messor (Forsskål, 1775)
- Metopograpsus oceanicus (Hombron & Jacquinot, 1846)
- Metopograpsus quadridentatus Stimpson, 1858
- Metopograpsus thukuhar (Owen, 1839)

A further extinct species is known.

== Gallery ==
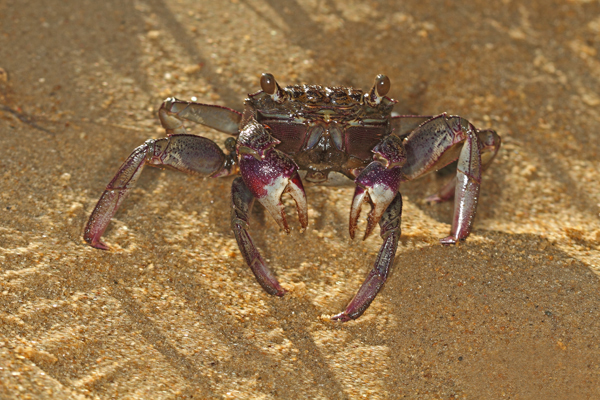
Metopograpsus latifrons from Karwar, India

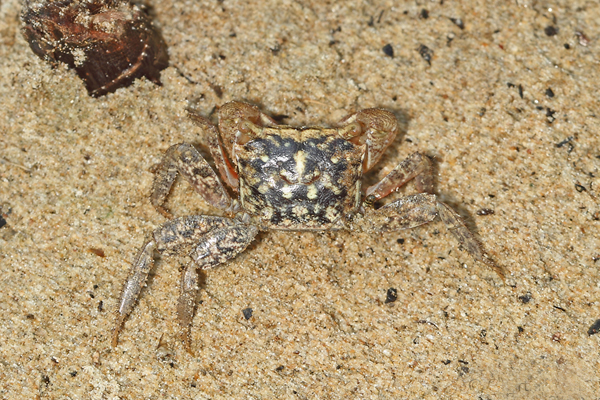
Metopograpsus messor from India

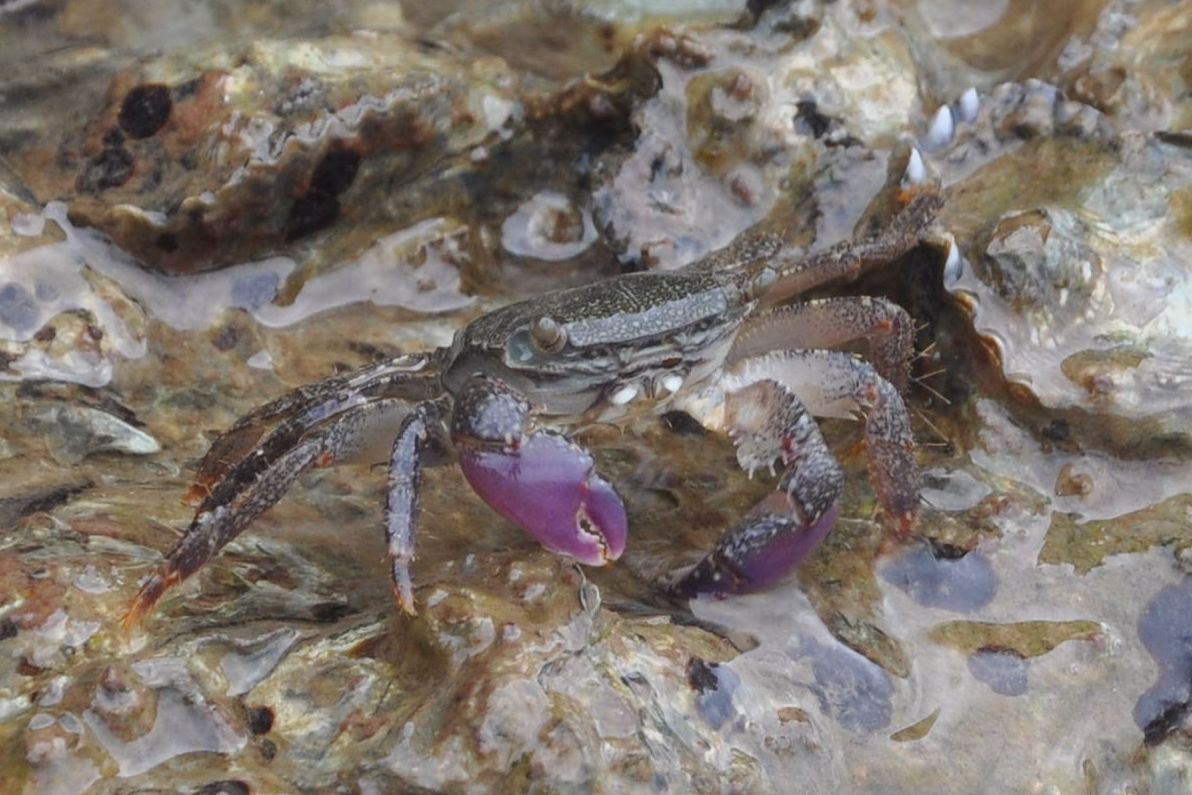
Unidentified species of Metopograpsus
