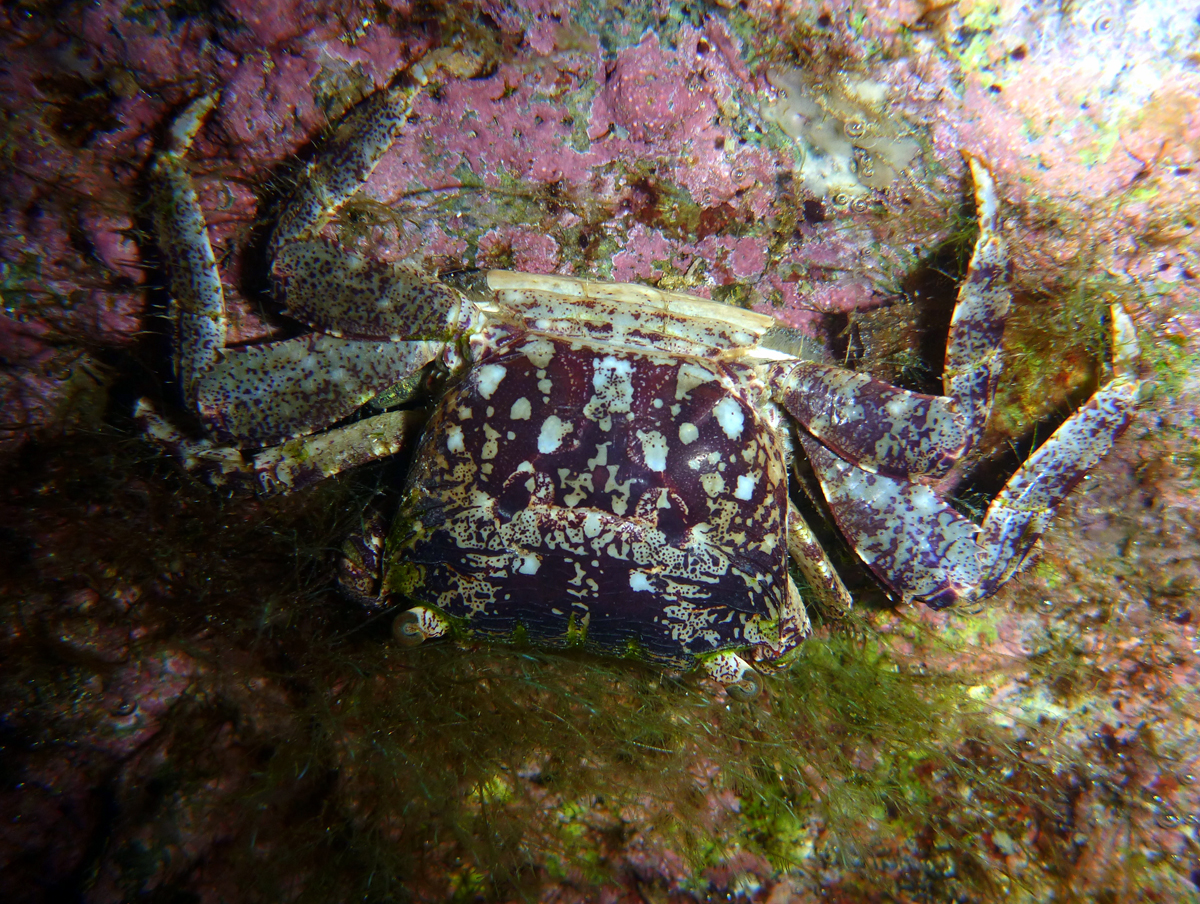

Scientific classification
- Domain: Eukaryota
- Kingdom: Animalia
- Phylum: Arthropoda
- Class: Malacostraca
- Order: Decapoda
- Suborder: Pleocyemata
- Infraorder: Brachyura
- Family: Grapsidae
- Genus: Metopograpsus
- Species: M. thukuhar

Binomial name
- Metopograpsus thukuhar (Owen, 1839)

Synonyms
- Grapsus thukuhar Owen, 1839; Metopograpsus eydouxi H. Milne Edwards, 1853; Metopograpsus intermedius H. Milne Edwards, 1853; Pachygrapsus parallelus Randall, 1840

= Metopograpsus thukuhar =

Thukuhar shore-crab

Species of crab

The thukuhar shore-crab (Metopograpsus thukuhar), also known as alamihi crab, is a species of crab that lives in mangroves all over from Africa to Fiji.

== Distribution ==
A mangrove inhabitant, it is found all over mangrove forests of Hawaii, Madagascar, Mauritius, Sumatra, Japan, Taiwan, China, Sri Lanka, India, Indonesia, Australia, Solomon Islands, Vanuatu, and Fiji.

== Description ==
Male grows up to maximum length of 5 cm. Carapace and legs brownish-yellow or brownish red in color along with mottling. Claws violet in adults and pinkish in juveniles.

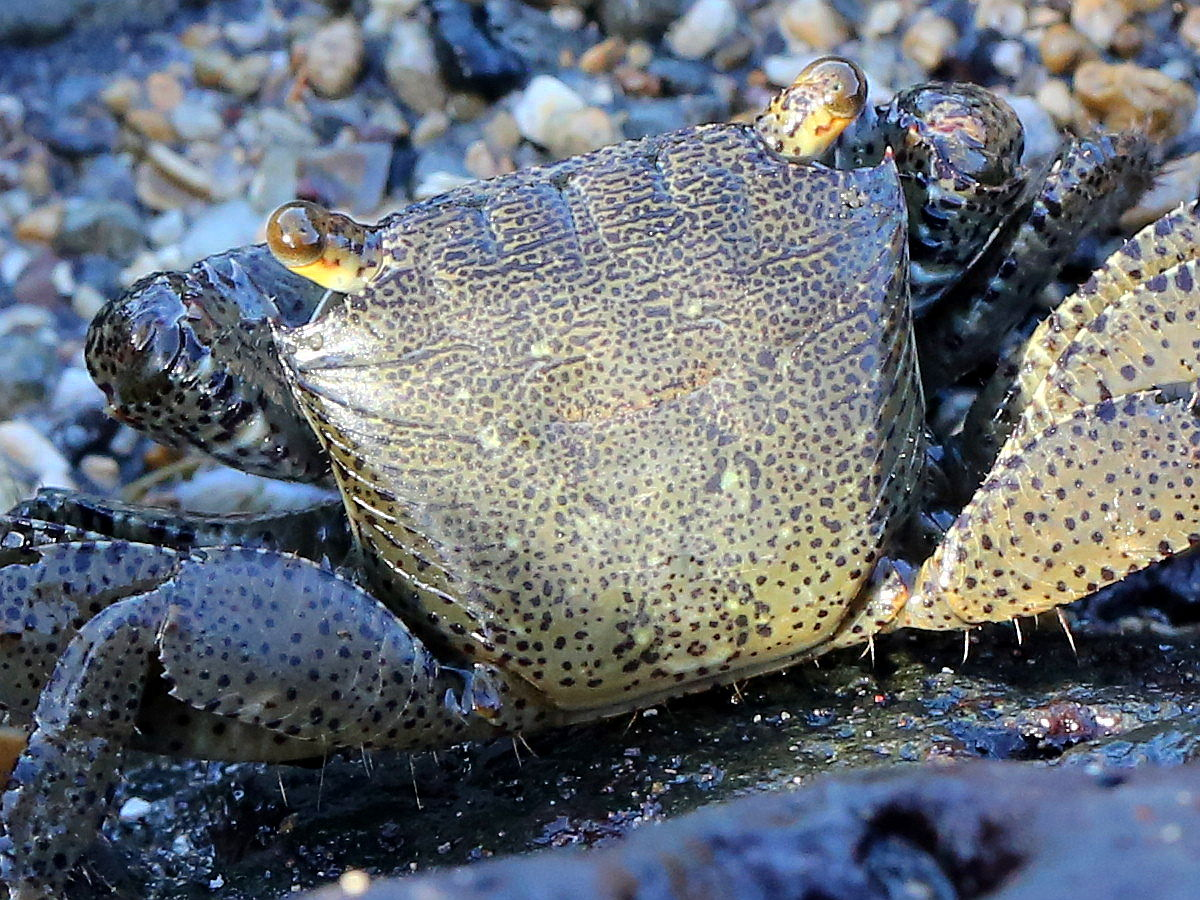
Light morph Hawaii

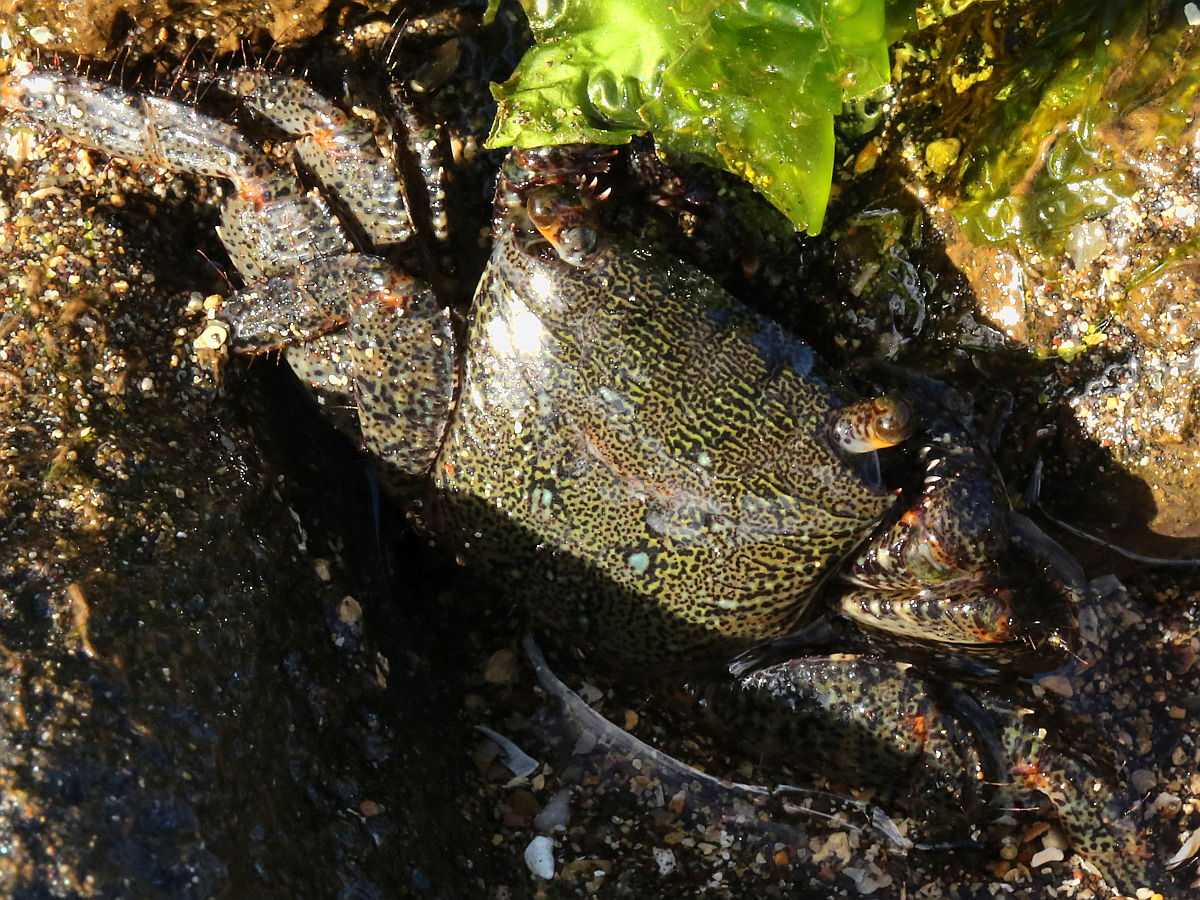
Dark morph Hawaii

== Ecology ==
The species is well distributed in mangrove regions mainly in Rhizophora mucronata and Ceriops tagal zones, hiding through mangrove roots. It is an omnivore feeds both on water plants, mangrove associates and animal carcasses. It is not a burrowing crab species, only live around lower trunk regions and roots.
