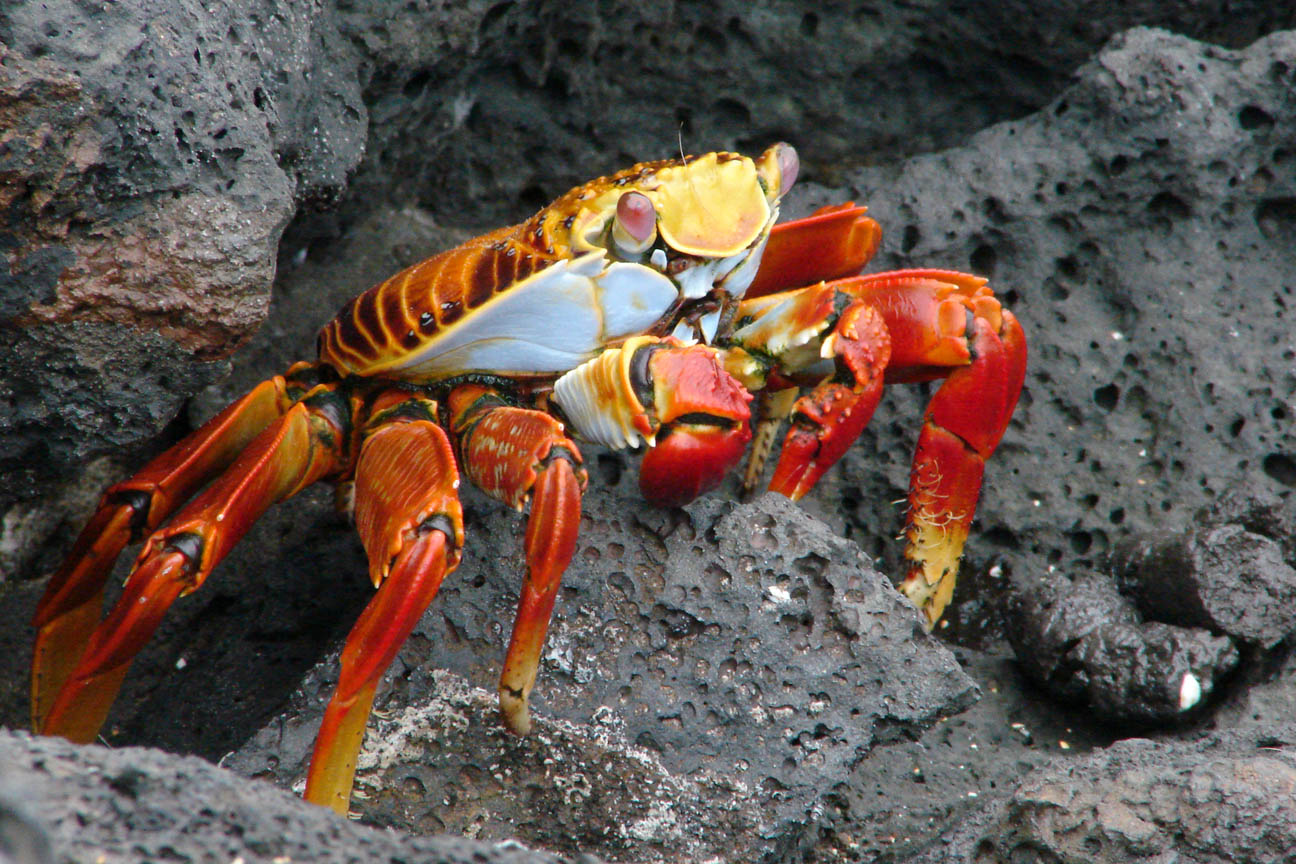
- Grapsus grapsus

Scientific classification
- Kingdom: Animalia
- Phylum: Arthropoda
- Clade: Pancrustacea
- Class: Malacostraca
- Order: Decapoda
- Suborder: Pleocyemata
- Infraorder: Brachyura
- Superfamily: Grapsoidea
- Family: Grapsidae; Macleay, 1838

Genera
- See text

= Grapsidae =

Family of crabs

The Grapsidae are a family of crabs known variously as marsh crabs, shore crabs, or talon crabs. The family has not been confirmed to form a monophyletic group and some taxa may belong in other families. They are found along the shore among rocks, in estuaries, marshes, and in some cases pelagic among drifting seaweeds and flotsam.

== Genera ==
A number of taxa, formerly treated as subfamilies of the family Grapsidae are now considered families in their own right, including the Varunidae and Plagusiidae. Forty species and ten genera remain in the family, two of the genera known only from fossils:

- Geograpsus Stimpson, 1858
- Goniopsis De Haan, 1833
- Grapsus Lamarck, 1801
- Leptograpsodes Montgomery, 1931
- Leptograpsus H. Milne Edwards, 1853
- Litograpsus † Schweitzer & Karasawa, 2004
- Metopograpsus H. Milne Edwards, 1853
- Miograpsus † Fleming, 1981
- Pachygrapsus Randall, 1840
- Planes Bowdich, 1825
