= Crab meat =

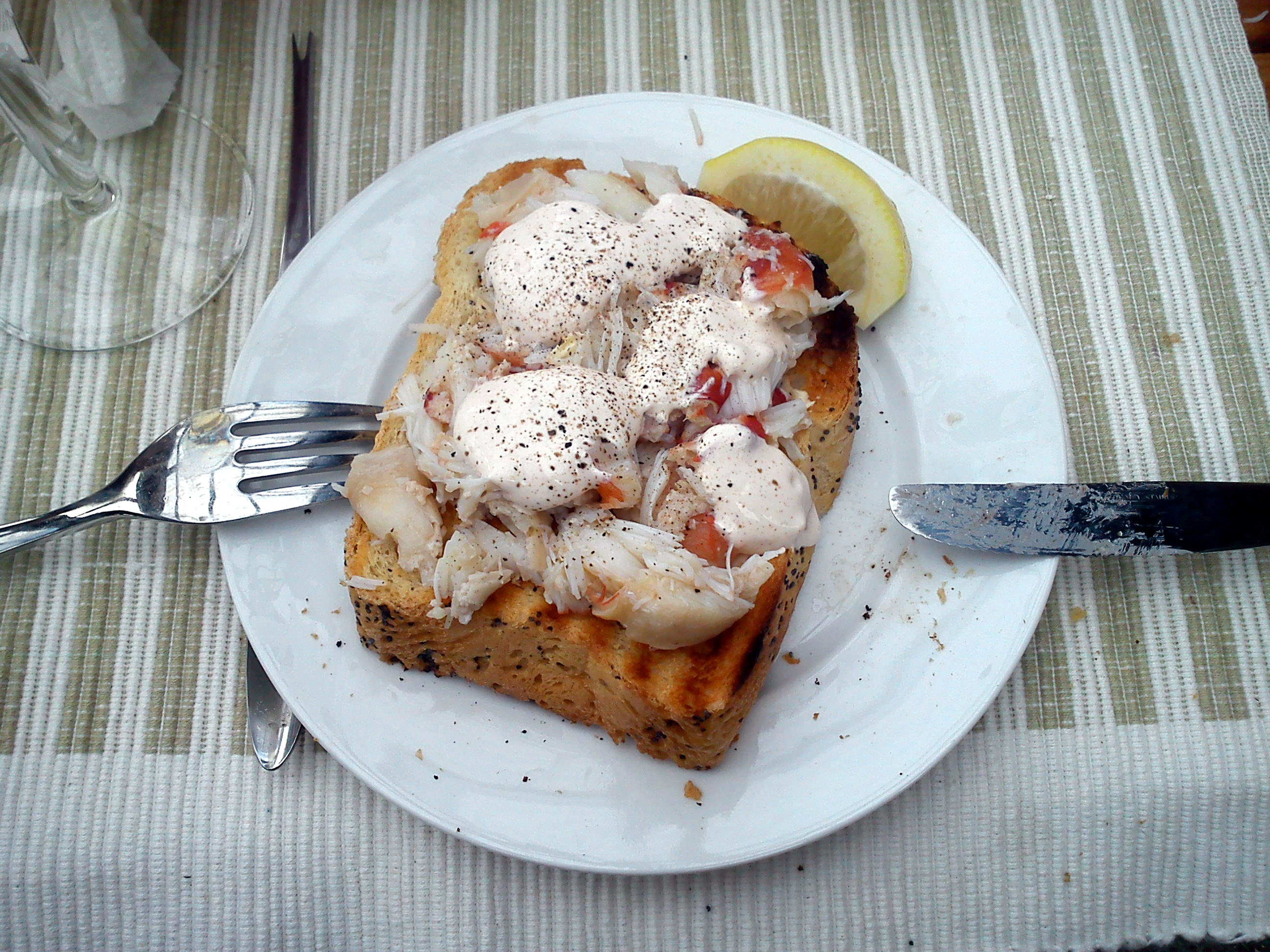
Crab meat from crab claws on toast

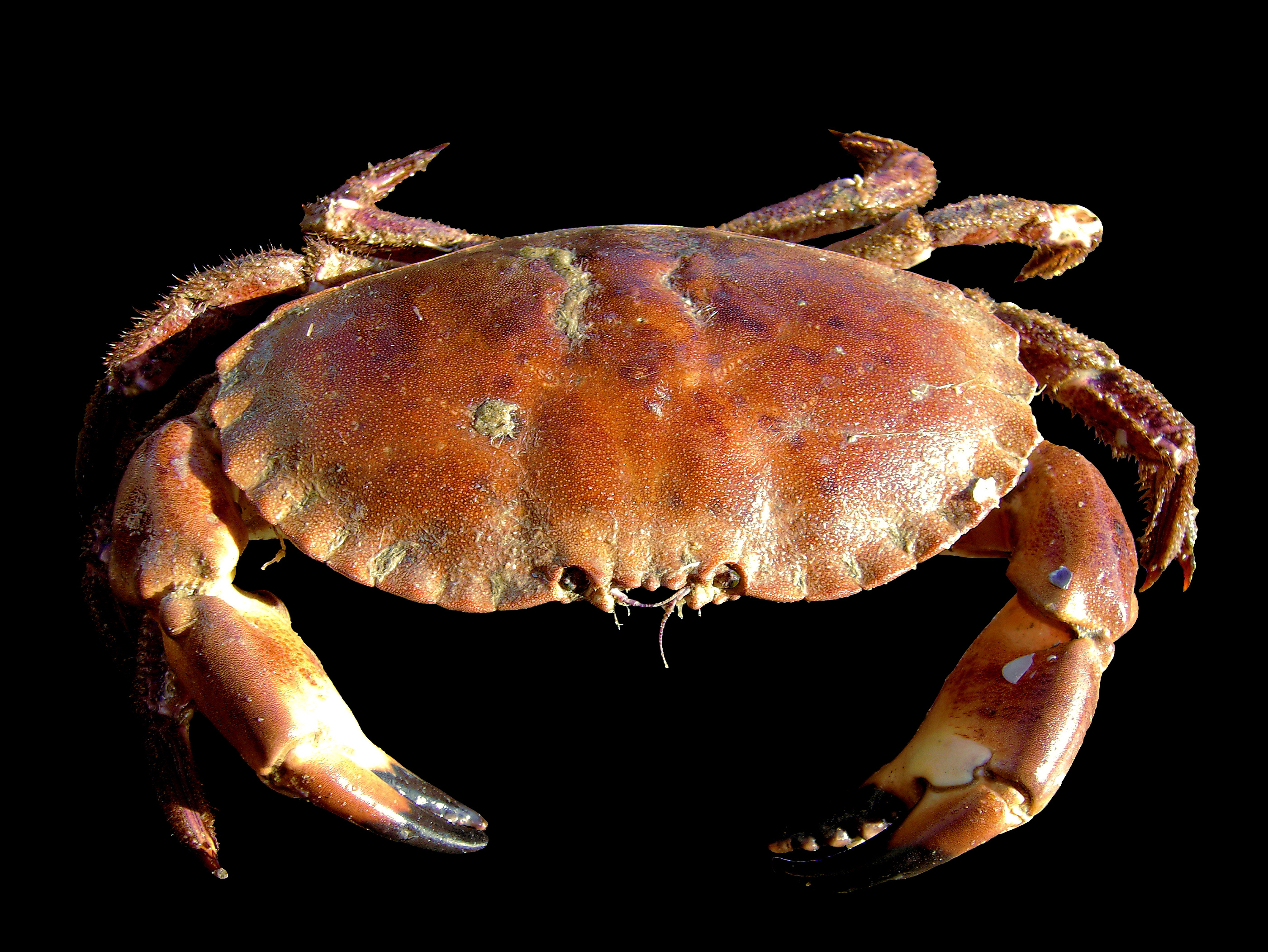
The brown crab is commonly used for its meat

Crab meat, also known as crab marrow, is the edible meat found in a crab, specifically in its legs and claws. It is widely used in global cuisines for its soft, delicate and sweet flavor.

Crab meat is low in fat and provides approximately 340 kilojoules (82 kcal) of food energy per 85-gram (3 oz) serving. Among the most commercially available species are the brown crab (Cancer pagurus), blue crab (Callinectes sapidus), blue swimming crab (Portunus pelagicus), and red swimming crab (Portunus haanii).

Grading systems vary by region, with distinctions such as white meat and brown meat based on body part and color.

The methods of crab meat harvesting differ among crab fisheries, including whole-crab processing and declawing, where one or both claws are removed and the live crab is returned to the water. This practice is controversial due to animal welfare concerns, although some species can regenerate lost claws through molting, typically about a year later. Crab meat is consumed fresh, frozen, canned, or as imitation crab (a processed seafood product). Labor practices, sustainability, and regional fishing regulations also influence the industry, particularly in regions such as the Chesapeake Bay and European fisheries, where notable challenges exist.

== Grades ==
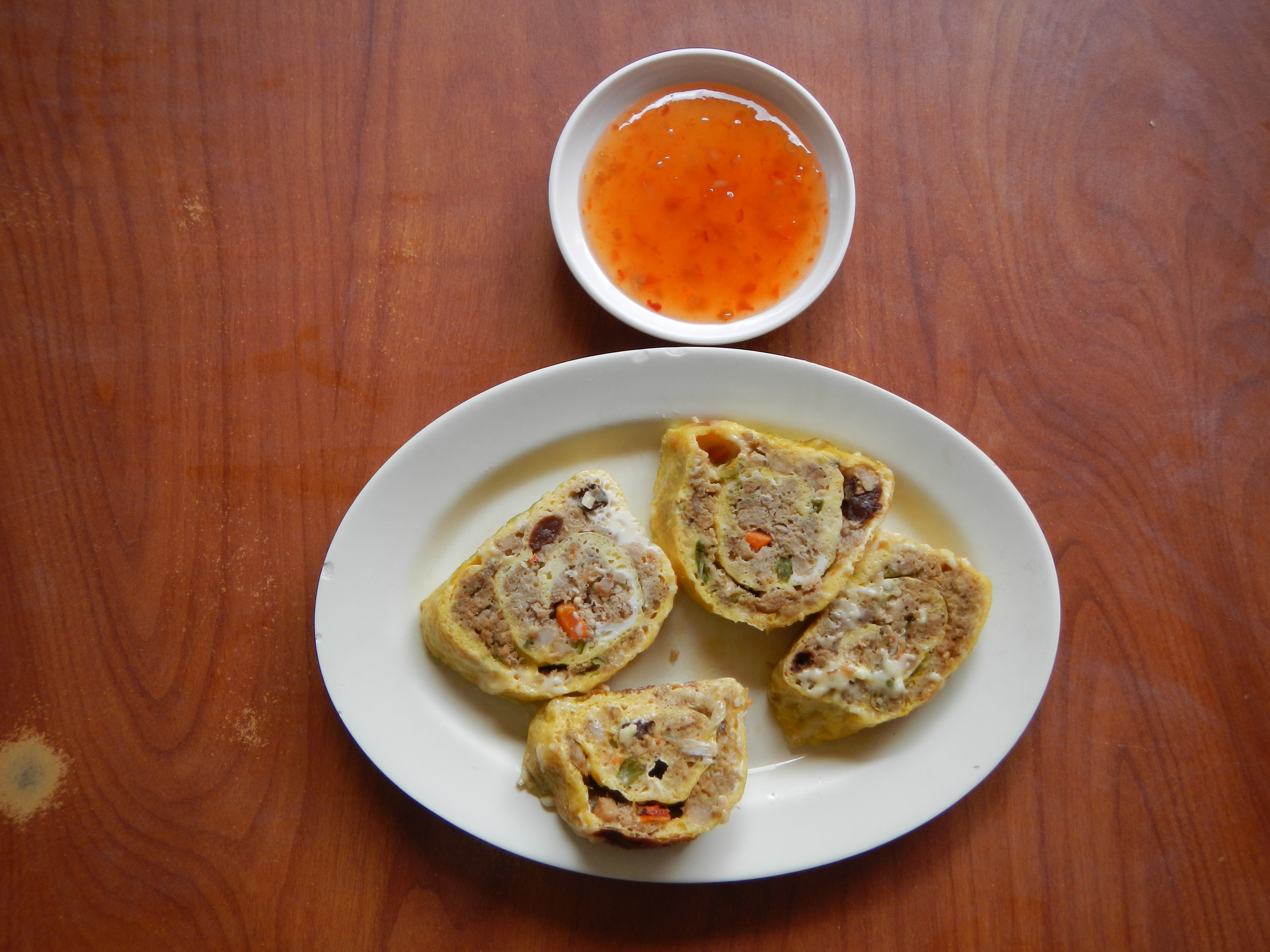
Crab meat roll (Philippines)

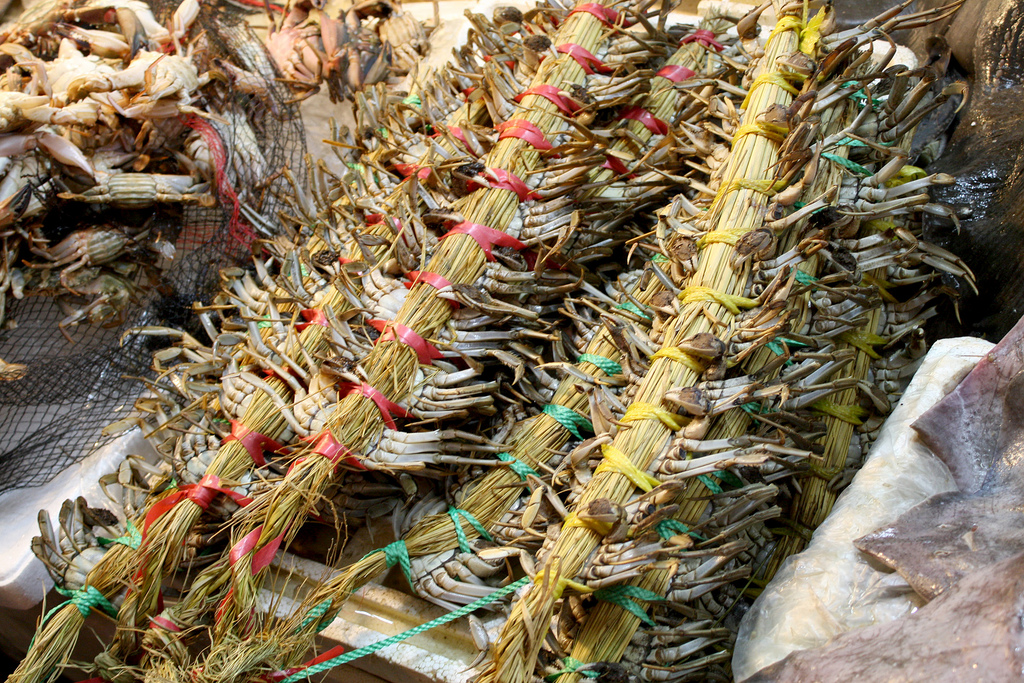
Live crab for sale at a market

=== European crab ===
In Western Europe, crab meat is commonly sourced from the species Cancer pagurus. This is a large crab noted for the sweet, delicate flavor of its meat. It is also known as the brown crab, the common crab, or the edible crab. The United Kingdom hosts significant fisheries for C. pagurus, with major operations in Scotland and substantial activity in the South West of England, notably Cornwall and Devon.

The highest grade of crab meat is "handpicked," referring to the manual extraction process that preserves the meat's natural flavor. In contrast, "machine-processed crab" employs water or air to separate the meat from the shell, which can adversely affect the flavor. C. pagurus crab meat is widely consumed throughout the countries from which it is fished. Due to its limited fresh shelf life of only about four days, much of the crab meat available through retailers is sold from previously frozen stock. Freezing can alter the texture and diminish the natural flavor of white crab meat, as its water content crystallizes during freezing. Alternatively, pasteurization offers a means to extend shelf life without significantly compromising flavor when done carefully.

C. pagurus provides two distinct types of meat:

==== White meat ====
White crab meat comes from the claws and legs. Predominantly white, it may exhibit a natural red or brown tinge. This meat is low in fat and high in protein, offering a delicate, sweet flavor, a pleasant aroma, and a flaky texture. Its versatility allows it to be used in various dishes, including sandwiches, pasta, risotto, and salad, and as a canapé topping.

==== Brown meat ====
Brown meat, consisting of the tomalley and the gonads, is located under the carapace. It has a higher natural fat content and is notably rich in omega-3 fatty acids. For instance, 100 grams of brown crab meat can provide approximately two-thirds of the recommended weekly intake of these compounds. This meat has a pâté-like texture and a rich, full flavor. The color and texture of brown meat can vary throughout the year, reflecting the crab’s physiological changes.

Brown crab meat may contain higher levels of cadmium, a toxic heavy metal. While moderate consumption is generally considered safe, regular intake of brown meat incurs potential health risks from cadmium exposure.

In culinary applications, both types of meat are valued for their distinct qualities. White meat is often favored for its delicate flavor and firm texture, making it suitable for a variety of dishes. Brown meat, with its richer flavor and softer texture, is commonly used to enhance sauces, soups, and pâtés.

=== U.S. crab ===
In the United States, crab meat is categorized into various grades based on the part of the crab from which the meat is harvested and the size of the crab. These grades help consumers and chefs select the appropriate type of meat for different culinary applications. Below is an overview of these grades:

US grades of crab meat
Name	Image	Description
Colossal Lump, or Mega Jumbo Lump	Crab Colossal	The largest whole pieces of white meat extracted from the two large muscles connected to the swimming fins of the crab. These impressive lumps are ideal for dishes where the crab meat is the centerpiece, such as cocktail presentations or upscale salads.
Lump		Whole, firm pieces of white meat sourced from the same muscles as Colossal Lump but from smaller crabs. It boasts a bright white color and succulent texture, making it perfect for high-quality crab cakes, cocktails, or sautéed dishes.
Broken Lump	Crab Lump	A blend of broken pieces of Jumbo Lump and large flakes of white body meat. This grade is versatile and commonly used in crab cakes, dips, salads, and casseroles where the crab meat is mixed with other ingredients.
Back fin		Flakes of white meat, including broken Jumbo Lump pieces and special grade meat from the body cavity. Often used in Maryland-style crab cakes, soups, and dips, providing a balance between flavor and affordability.
Special		Smaller flakes of white meat taken from the body cavity of the crab. Its fine texture makes it suitable for dishes like crab salads, omelets, and soups where smaller crab pieces are appropriate.
Claw		Darker, reddish-brown meat harvested from the claws and swimming fins of the crab. It has a stronger flavor compared to white meat grades and is often used in dishes with robust sauces, such as soups, bisques, and curries, where its pronounced taste can stand out.
Claw fingers, or Cocktail Claws	Claw Fingers	The pincers of the crab with part of the shell removed, leaving the meat exposed. They are typically served as garnish, hors d'œuvre or appetizers, often accompanied by dipping sauces.

== Imitation ==
In the United States, imitation crab meat, also known as surimi, is widely used as a cost-effective alternative to real crab meat, particularly in dishes like seafood salads and American-style sushi, including the California roll. One of the main reasons for its popularity is the labor-intensive and expensive process of extracting fresh crab meat, making imitation crab a more accessible option for both consumers and food service operations.

The flaky, red-edged imitation crab seen in many American dishes is most commonly made from Alaska pollock (Gadus chalcogrammus), a mild-flavored, white-fleshed fish that is abundant in the Bering Sea near Alaska, and also found off the coast of central California and in the Sea of Japan. Because of its neutral taste and smooth texture, pollock serves as an ideal base for artificial flavoring and shaping into crab-like products. Other fish are also used depending on availability and regional production, including New Zealand hoki (Macruronus novaezelandiae), golden threadfin bream (Nemipterus virgatus), and white croaker (Pennahia argentata), especially in Southeast Asian manufacturing facilities.

Surimi originated over 800 years ago in Japan, where it was traditionally used to make products like kamaboko—steamed or grilled fish cakes, still popular today. The specific method for turning surimi into imitation crab meat was developed in Japan in 1975. By 1983, American companies had begun manufacturing imitation crab meat domestically, leading to its widespread use in the modern food industry.

== Animal welfare ==
In the declawing of crabs, one or both claws of a live crab are manually pulled off and the crab is then returned to the water. It occurs in several fisheries worldwide, such as in the Florida stone crab (Menippe mercenaria) fishery, the north-east Atlantic deep-water red crab (Chaceon affinis) fishery and in southern Iberia, where the major claws of the fiddler crab (Uca tangeri) are harvested. There is scientific debate about whether crabs experience pain in this procedure, but there is evidence it increases mortality.

Declawing crabs has been shown to cause mortality rates as high as 47% and negatively affect feeding behavior. Once claws are separated from the body, the tissue begins to deteriorate, which is why crabs are typically cooked or chilled soon after capture to preserve meat quality.

== See also ==
- Crab dip – Dip typically prepared from cream cheese and crab meat
- List of crab dishes
- Pain in invertebrates
