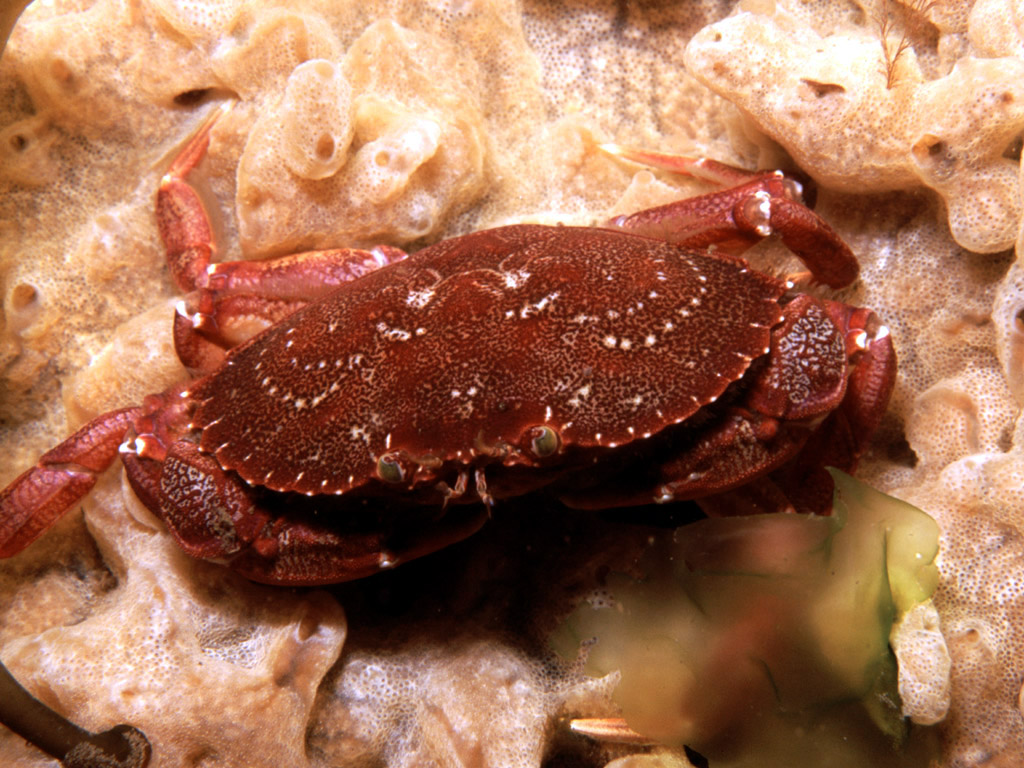

Scientific classification
- Kingdom: Animalia
- Phylum: Arthropoda
- Clade: Pancrustacea
- Class: Malacostraca
- Order: Decapoda
- Suborder: Pleocyemata
- Infraorder: Brachyura
- Family: Cancridae
- Genus: Cancer
- Species: C. irroratus

Binomial name
- Cancer irroratus Say, 1817

= Cancer irroratus =

Species of crab

Cancer irroratus (Atlantic rock crab or peekytoe crab) is a crab in the genus Cancer. It is found from Iceland to South Carolina at depths of up to 2,600 ft (790 m), and reaches 133 mm (5.2 in) across the carapace.

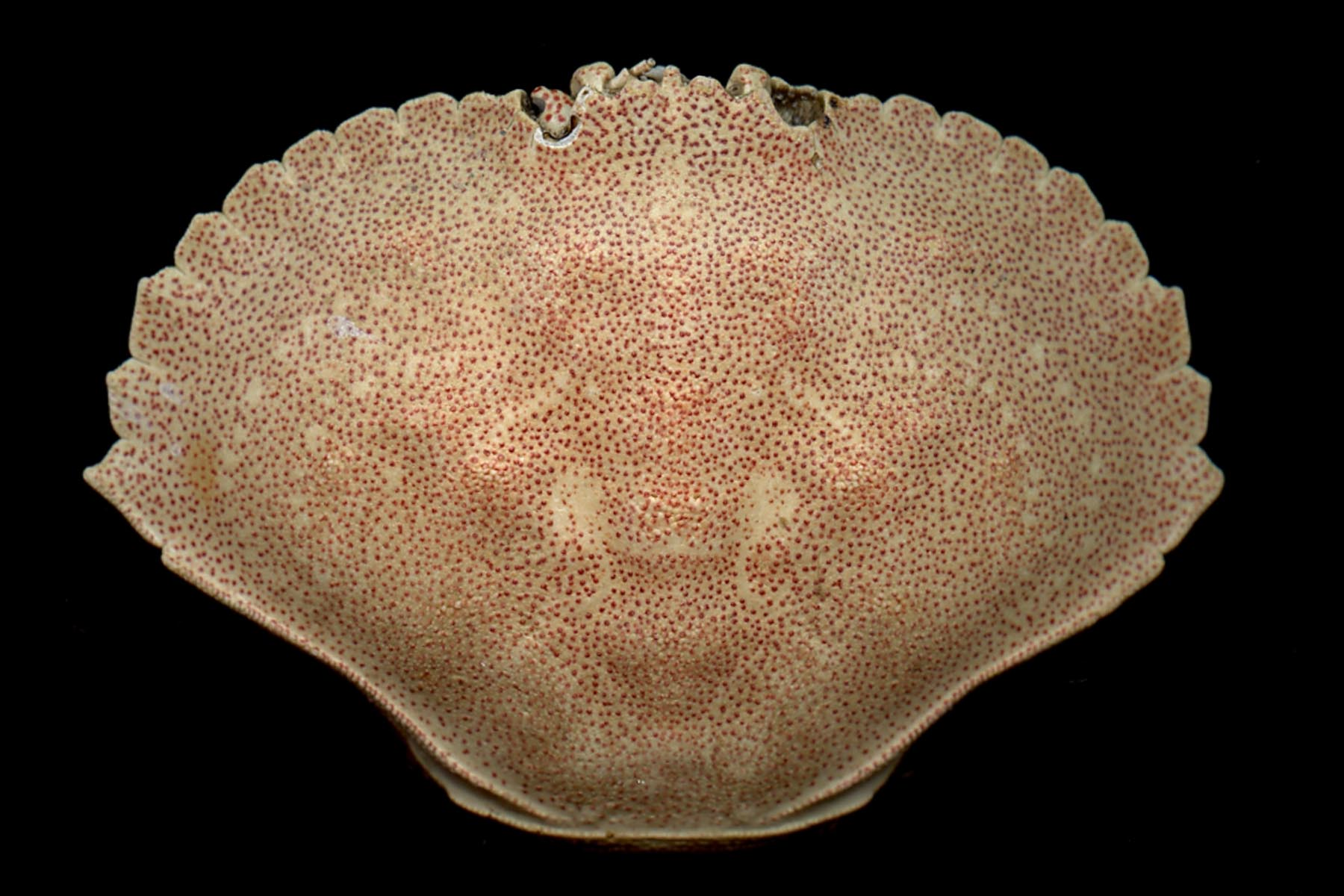
A molted carapace of Cancer irroratus from Long Beach, New York.

== Description ==
This crab species occurs on the eastern coast of North America, from Labrador to Iceland to South Carolina. Rock crabs live over a large depth range, from well above the low tide line to as deep as 2,600 feet (790 m). They can live up to 8 years. Cancer irroratus has nine marginal teeth on the front edge of the carapace beside each eye, and reaches a carapace width of 5.25 inches (133 mm). These crabs are similar in color to and overlap in size with the Jonah crab, Cancer borealis. The two species can indeed be distinguished by the purplish-brown spots on the carapace of C. irroratus (contrasting with the yellow spots of C. borealis), and by the smooth edges to the teeth on the edge of the carapace (denticulate in C. borealis). Males can range up to 8–127mm, while females can range up to 113mm. The Rock Crabs, they usually molt in between the months of April and July. The two fount claws of the crab are very important because they are the ones that can grab pray as well as holding it while eating it.

== Reproduction ==
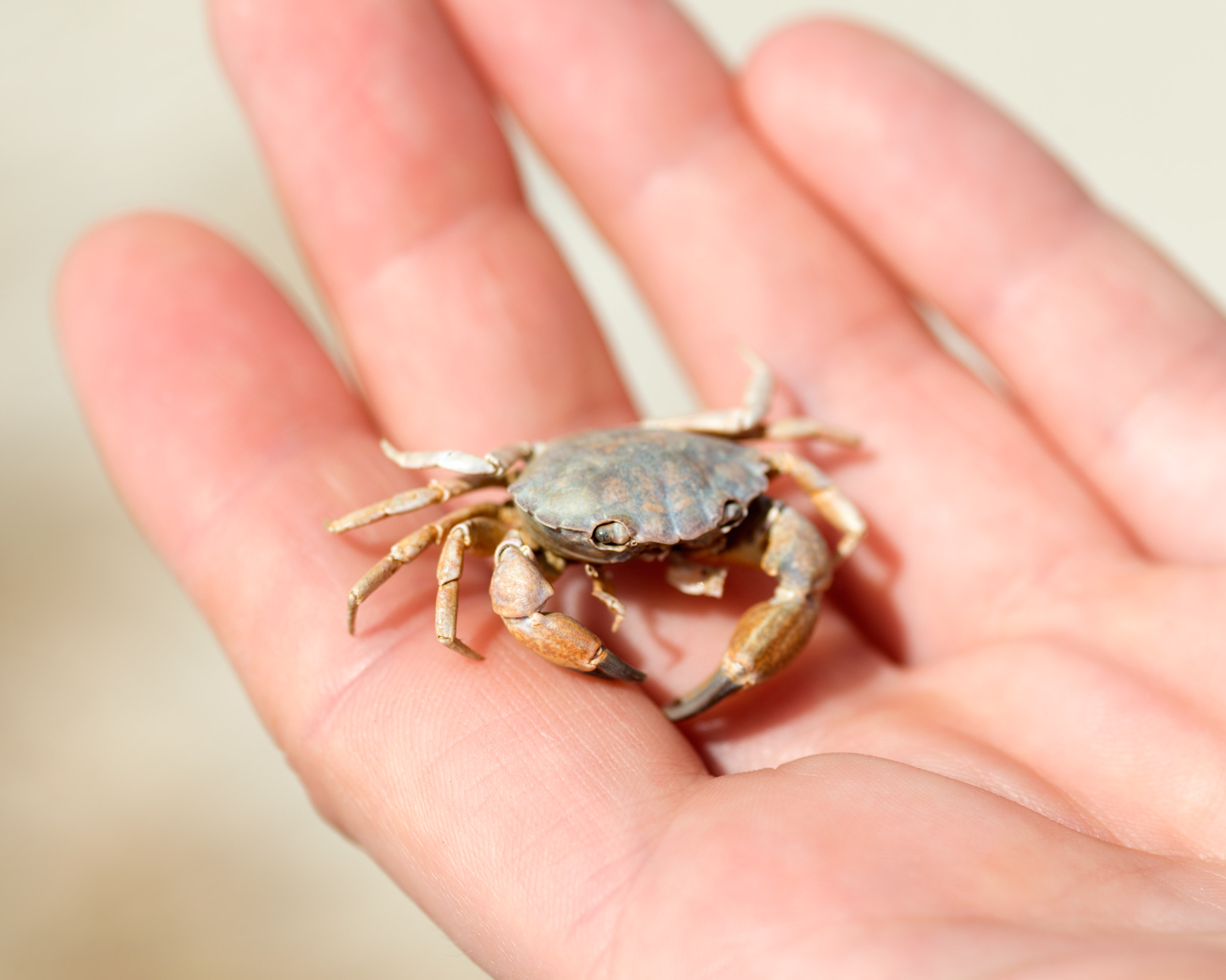

During the month of June, if the male gonads are larger than 101 mm, that means they are well developed and mature. If they are less than 50 mm, that means that they are underdeveloped or in an early stage of maturity. Females smaller than 70mm are in early stage of ovarian development. During the reproduction season they tend to go to shallow waters, like tilted pools or rocky areas. After females and male mate, the females will lay between 125,000 and 500,000 eggs. After the eggs are laid between the month of June and September, the larval crabs stay in the water until they hatch. After two mouths being in the larval stage, they start the baby crab stage where they can finally hunt for food.

== Diet and predators ==
The Atlantic rock crab’s diet consists of shellfish like worms, clams, mussels, sea urchins, and even other crabs. But where they get most of the energy from is eating mussels, because mussels provide the crabs with all the fatty acids that they need. Atlantic rock crabs are most vulnerable when they are caught in lobster traps, as well as lobsters eating the tiny rock crabs when they are still in a larva stage because their shell is soft. Over the years, as the seafood industry became more demanding, fishermen started to catch rock crabs to sell them in the fish market or have them processed by other people. To keep the population steady and prevent overfishing, there are some regulations in place. For example, fishermen must have the license for a specific measurement in order to keep the crab (102mm), and people are forbidden to catch female crabs so they can create new offspring.

== Conservation ==
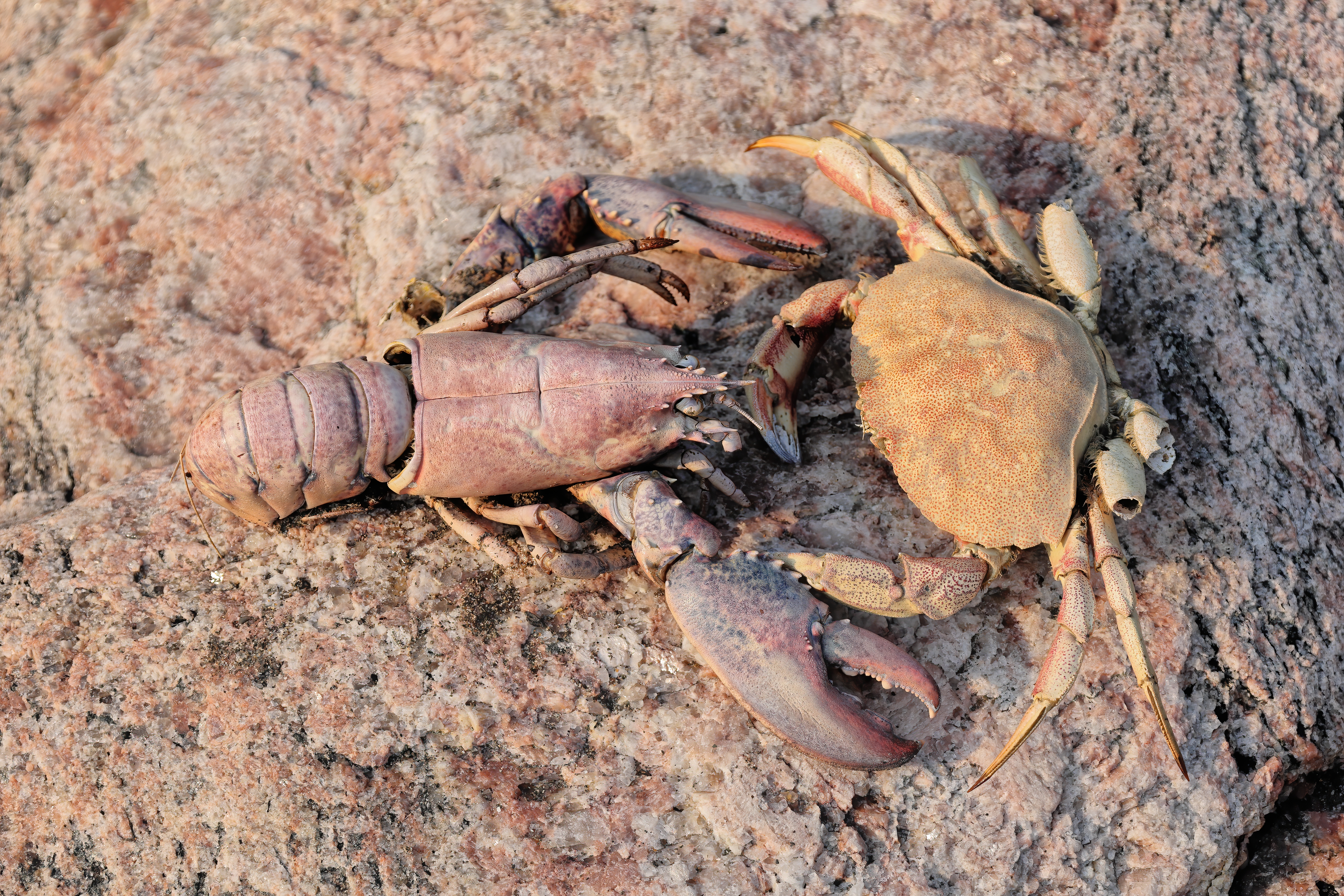

The rock crab has recently become a popular culinary item. The name "peekytoe crab" refers to the fact that the legs are "picked" (a Maine colloquialism meaning "curved inward"). Until about 1997, they were considered a nuisance species by the lobster industry because they would eat the bait off of lobster traps. But over time scientists found out they are a major part of the ecosystem- they have a much larger diet because they are energy recycling, meaning they use energy that would normally be wasted. The crabs are also an important development to lobster, because lobster eat the soft tissues and a little bit of the hard part of the crab which not only it helps with their growth but also larva development. So far, scientists do not know if the population of the rock crab is increasing or decreasing, but efforts are being made to keep the populations and reproduction stable.

== Invasion ==
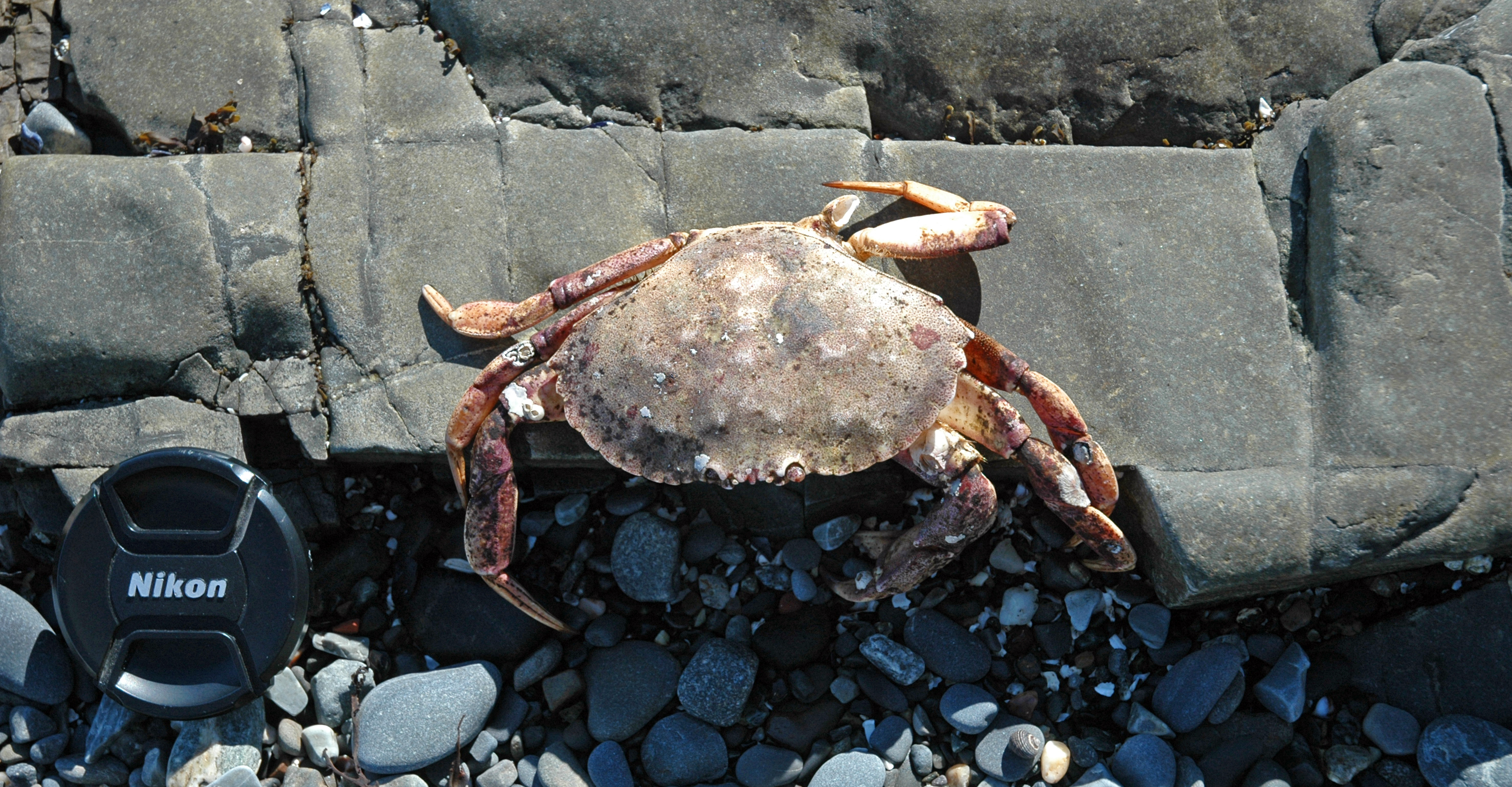

Even though the Atlantic Rock crab is important to the ecosystem because it helps steady the population of shrimp and other crabs, it's also a threat to some parts of the world. For example, in Iceland and the Eastern north Atlantic, they recently discovered Atlantic rock crabs that are not native to their island. Scientists think they got to Iceland by a larva in ballast water, and developed and reproduced in the Icelandic water. As of 2014, they are currently the most abundant brachyuran in the areas studied in southwest Iceland.
