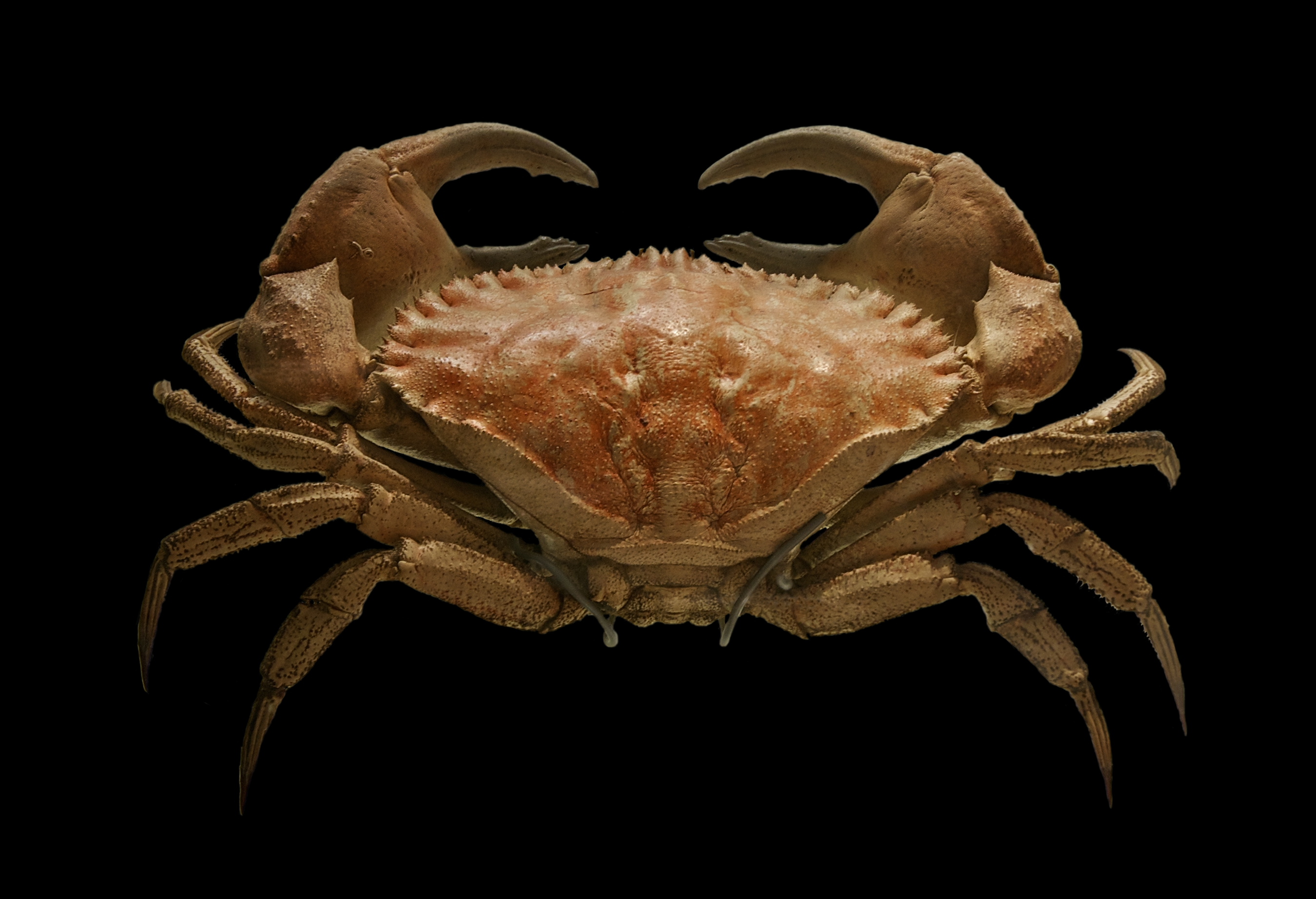

Scientific classification
- Domain: Eukaryota
- Kingdom: Animalia
- Phylum: Arthropoda
- Class: Malacostraca
- Order: Decapoda
- Suborder: Pleocyemata
- Infraorder: Brachyura
- Family: Cancridae
- Genus: Cancer
- Species: C. bellianus

Binomial name
- Cancer bellianus Johnson, 1861

= Cancer bellianus =

Species of crab

Cancer bellianus, the toothed rock crab, is a common species of crab in the north-eastern Atlantic Ocean.

== Description ==
It grows up to 130 millimetres (5.1 in) in carapace length, and is pale brown with red spots.

== Distribution and ecology ==
Its geographical range extends from near Höfn on the south coast of Iceland (at nearly 64° N) south to Morocco, including the Azores, Madeira and the Canary Islands. It is found at depths from 50 metres (160 ft) to over 730 m (2,400 ft). While the species is sometimes abundant in the south of its range, it is uncommon further north; all the specimens from Brittany and further north were male, and are thought to be recent travellers from further south, rather than representing a stable northern population.

== Fisheries ==
C. bellianus is caught as bycatch by artisan fishermen targeting Palinurus elephas, and as much as 10 t can be caught annually.
