= Black spot disease (crustaceans) =

Shell disease in crustaceans

Black spot disease in crustaceans, commonly studied on the edible brachyuran crab Cancer pagurus, is a progressive degradation of the carapace cuticle and expresses itself by discoloration of the carapace. The disease has been observed on a variety of crustacean species including crabs, lobster, and shrimp. This discoloration, black spots on the carapace, chelae, or legs, is the result of melanisation; a defense response to the deterioration of the cuticle. Black nodules have also been observed on the gills, heart, and hepatopancreas of affected individuals, and the presence of the disease is associated with accumulation of material in the lungs and tubular degradation in the hepatopancreas. Simply put, there is a positive correlation between the amount of black spot on the external carapace and decreased function of internal organs. There is some debate surrounding the cause of the disease, with both bacteria and fungi having been implicated as shell disease pathogens. Crustaceans can rid themselves of the diseased carapace by molting, as the severity of the infection is typically mild. However, in older individuals with lower molt occurrences, the disease can persist, and eventually lead to death.
