= Cancer johngarthi =

Scientific classification
- Domain: Eukaryota
- Kingdom: Animalia
- Phylum: Arthropoda
- Class: Malacostraca
- Order: Decapoda
- Suborder: Pleocyemata
- Infraorder: Brachyura
- Family: Cancridae
- Genus: Cancer
- Species: C. johngarthi

Binomial name
- Cancer johngarthi Carvacho, 1989

Species of crab

Cancer johngarthi is a species of crab that lives in the eastern Pacific Ocean from Mexico to Panama. It was separated from C. porteri in 1989, and is the subject of a small-scale fishery off Baja California.

== Distribution ==
C. johngarthi lives along the Pacific coast of Mexico and Central America, from 29°N at Isla Guadalupe to 7°N in Panama, including southern parts of the Gulf of California (Sea of Cortez).

== Description and taxonomic history ==
C. johngarthi was only recognised as a separate species in 1989, its members having previously been treated under C. porteri. The specific epithet commemorates John Shrader Garth of the University of Southern California; Garth had recorded "C. porteri" from Sinaloa, Mexico, in 1961. It differs from C. porteri chiefly in the "paper shell" texture of the carapace. C. johngarthi also has longer legs and stouter claws, although the differences in claws are not clear in juveniles, due to differences in allometry. According to data from experimental fisheries, captured males varied in size from a carapace width of 98 mm (3.9 in) to 176 mm (6.9 in), while females were slightly smaller, at 87–153 mm (3.4–6.0 in).

== Fishery ==
In 2004, the government of Mexico approved a trial fishery for C. johngarthi off the Baja California peninsula, initially restricted to two fishing vessels, with only one of the two actually engaging in fishing for C. johngarthi. The fishery consists of truncated conical crab pots, each 60 cm (24 in) tall, and tapering from 150 cm (59 in) at the base to 75 cm (30 in) at the top. They are placed 30–40 m (98–131 ft) apart at depths of 100–400 m (330–1,310 ft). The catch per unit effort decreases the longer the traps are left in place, and the majority of the crabs caught in the traps was male.
