= Anatolikos =

Scientific classification
- Kingdom: Animalia
- Phylum: Arthropoda
- Clade: Pancrustacea
- Class: Malacostraca
- Order: Decapoda
- Suborder: Pleocyemata
- Infraorder: Brachyura
- Family: Cancridae
- Subfamily: Cancrinae
- Genus: Anatolikos; Schweitzer & Feldmann, 2000

Species
- 2

Genus of crabs

Anatolikos is a genus of two species of crabs in the family Cancridae. They are recorded from Japan and Taiwan. Two fossil species are known, one from Japan and one from Mexico.

These crabs were classified in the genus Cancer until 2000, when it was split into several new genera.

Anatolikos species have a carapace that is wider than long and granular in texture. It is edged with several spines separated by fissures. Five of the spines coalesce to form a front that extends past the eyes, a character unique to the genus. The orbital rims are thickened; the genus Anisospinos has a similar feature, but can be distinguished by its sharp, curving spines.

The genus name is from the Greek anatolikos ("eastern"), a reference to its range in Japan. It includes the following species:

- †Anatolikos fujinaensis (Sakumoto, Karasawa & Takayasu, 1992)
- †Anatolikos itoigawa (Karasawa, 1990)
- Anatolikos japonicus (Ortmann, 1893)
- †Anatolikos tomowoi (Karasawa, 1990)
- Anatolikos tumifrons (Yokoya, 1933)
- †Anatolikos undecimspinosus Schweitzer, Feldmann, González-Barba & Ćosović, 2006
