= Declawing of crabs =

Removal of a live crab's claws

Declawing of crabs is the process whereby one or both claws of a crab are manually detached before the return of the live crab to the water, as practiced in the fishing industry worldwide. Crabs commonly have the ability to regenerate lost limbs after a period of time, and thus declawing is viewed as a potentially more sustainable method of fishing. Due to the time it takes for a crab to regrow lost limbs, however, whether or not the practice represents truly sustainable fishing is still a point of scientific inquiry, and the ethics of declawing are also subject to debates over pain in crustaceans.

While not always fatal, declawing can substantially alter the chances of a crab's survival in the wild. Declawing is a controversial practice; some jurisdictions have banned it partially or completely, while others only allow the crab's claws to be harvested commercially.

== Procedure ==
Declawing is done by hand. To ensure a clean break along the natural fracture plane, one finger is placed on the basal cheliped joint. A rapid and firm downward motion is then applied as the claw is fully extended, breaking the claw at the basi-ischum between the coxa at the base of the leg and the merus.

Particularly for crabs whose whole bodies are not consumed by humans, declawing is an attractive practice. Claw removal can facilitate storage and transport of crab meat, eliminate cannibalism within storage tanks, and make handling easier for crew.

== Effects ==
Crabs that survive the initial declawing face potential disadvantages in feeding, mating, and self-defense. The most immediate impact of declawing, however, is possible death. In an experiment using commercial techniques conducted between 1977 and 1978, 47% of Florida stone crabs that had both claws removed died after declawing, as did 28% of single-claw amputees. 76% of these casualties occurred within 24 hours of declawing.

Declawing also affects the ability of a crab to feed, as crabs generally use their claws to facilitate the capture and consumption of their prey. Declawed stone crabs are forced to scavenge as opposed to actively hunt and forage. Stone crabs in controlled experimental settings still consumed the same amount of food, but altered their feeding habits after declawing, eating fish instead of bivalves, normally an important part of their diet in the wild, because bivalves must be opened with the crab's muscular claw. Outside experimental settings, where declawed crabs must actively compete for food, mortality from starvation poses a significant danger. Research on Jonah crabs by Carloni and Goldstein (2016) found that declawed individuals were much more likely to refuse food altogether. Ultimately, different species of crabs respond in different ways to limb loss, with heterochelous crabs facing particular difficulties.

Additionally, declawed crabs show significantly lower activity levels than negative controls, and may have difficulties attracting mates. McCambridge, Dick, and Elwood (2016) demonstrated that brown crabs that had autotomized (detached their own claws) fared better in mating than manually declawed crabs, which were much less likely to successfully attract females. Effects on mating appear to vary by species; studies on the green crab and the velvet crab demonstrate that the loss of limbs impair mating chances, but evidence of such an effect among the Atlantic blue crab is mixed.

=== Pain and stress caused by declawing ===
Whether crustaceans are capable of feeling pain is a topic of ongoing scientific discussion and debate. It has been argued that because crabs can autotomize their claws, manual declawing along natural fracture planes might not cause pain. Patterson, Dick, and Elwood (2007), however, found that declawing heightened physiological stress responses measured through analysis of haemolymph in declawed crabs more so than in autotomized ones.

== Regulation ==
The regulations on crab fishing varies across the globe based on region and species of crab, and not all crabs caught are declawed. The United Kingdom prohibited declawing for 14 years, from 1986 to 2000.

In the United States, different states have adopted a variety of measures regarding declawing. Regulations on the Alaskan king crab fishing industry do not make any mention of declawing, and implicitly assume the entire crab will be taken. Some Gulf Coast states such as Florida and Louisiana prohibit the harvesting of whole stone crab, allowing for declawing only. In contrast, declawing Jonah crab in Maryland was banned after 2015 unless a vessel could prove it had historically conducted the practice and was registered in a state where the practice was allowed.

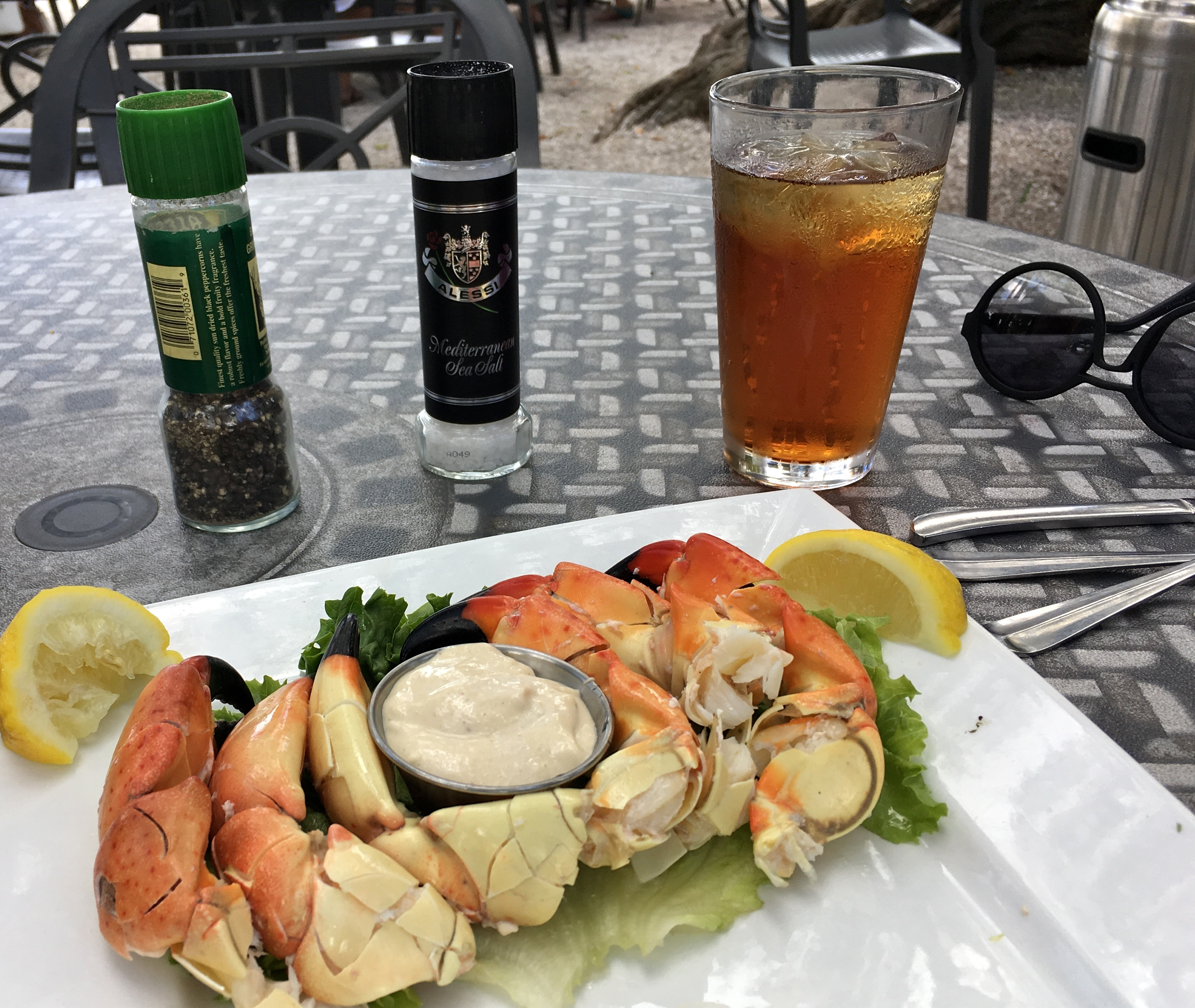
Florida stone crab claws served as food. The Florida stone crab fishery routinely practices the declawing of crabs.

== Sustainability ==
The central argument for declawing is that because crabs can regenerate lost limbs, it is inherently more sustainable than the capture of whole crabs. Yet claws are a large portion of a crab's biomass, ranging from 20% to over 50% of some species' total weight, and thus regeneration can be highly energy- and time-consuming. The empirical occurrence of regenerated claws in fishery harvests is low, with studies on stone crabs calculating from less than 10% (Davis et al., 1978), to 13% (Florida Fish and Wildlife Conservation Commission, 2011). Larger, older crabs generally do not survive long enough to regrow their claws, as they are near the end of their lifespan.

== See also ==
- Crab fisheries
- Crustacean
- Pain in animals
- Pain in crustaceans
- Pain in invertebrates
