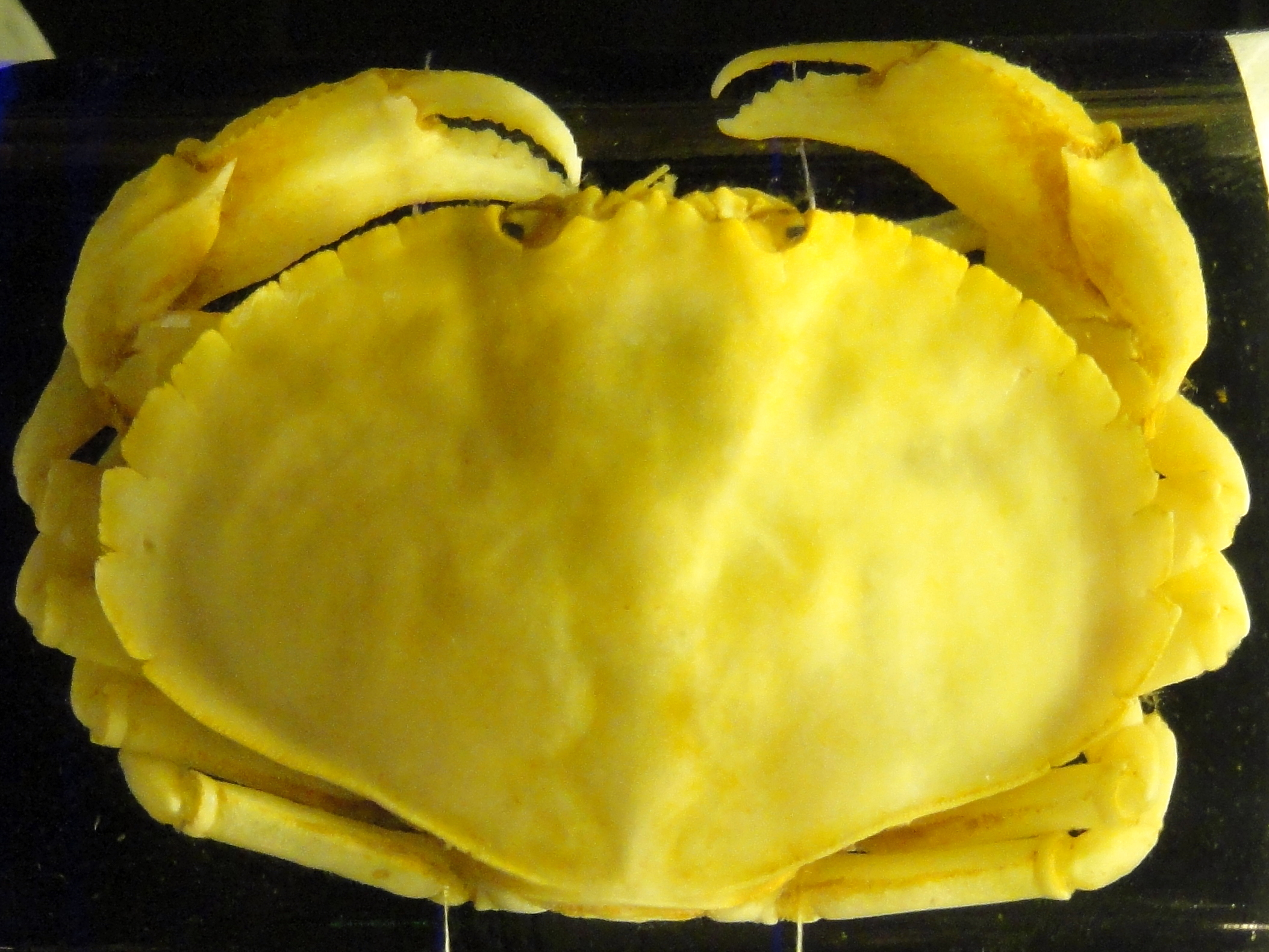

Scientific classification
- Kingdom: Animalia
- Phylum: Arthropoda
- Class: Malacostraca
- Order: Decapoda
- Suborder: Pleocyemata
- Infraorder: Brachyura
- Family: Cancridae
- Genus: Cancer
- Species: C. plebejus

Binomial name
- Cancer plebejus Poeppig, 1836

= Cancer plebejus =

Species of crustacean

Cancer plebejus is a species of crab in the genus Cancer. Its common name is the Chilean crab.

== Distribution ==
C. plebejus can be found off the coast of Chile and Peru.
