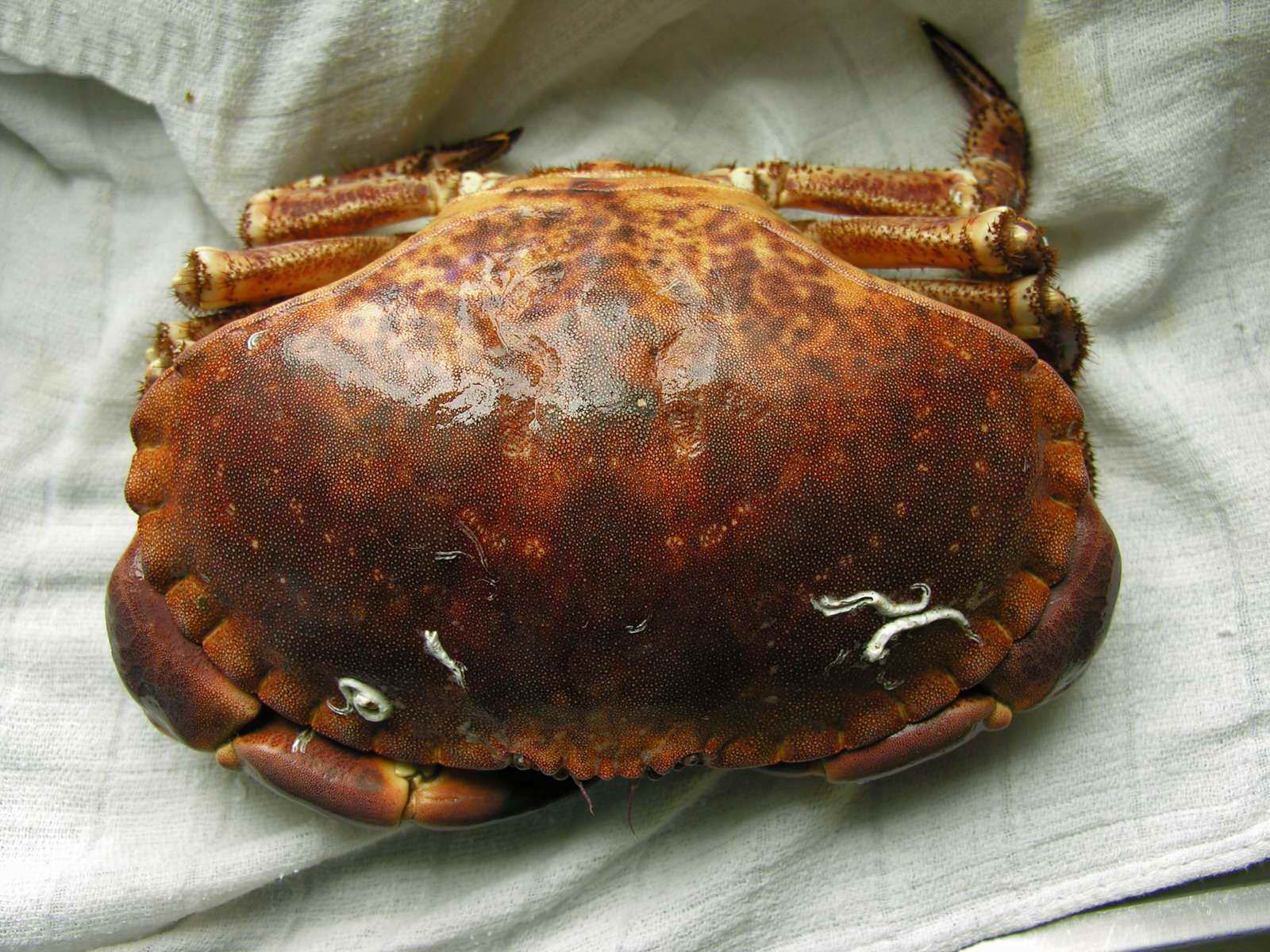
- Edible crab, Cancer pagurus

Scientific classification
- Domain: Eukaryota
- Kingdom: Animalia
- Phylum: Arthropoda
- Class: Malacostraca
- Order: Decapoda
- Suborder: Pleocyemata
- Infraorder: Brachyura
- Family: Cancridae
- Genus: Cancer; Linnaeus, 1758

Type species
- Cancer pagurus Linnaeus, 1758

Synonyms
- Platycarcinus H. Milne-Edwards, 1834

= Cancer (genus) =

Cancer Temporal range: Miocene–Recent

Genus of crabs

Cancer is a genus of marine crabs in the family Cancridae. It includes eight extant species and three extinct species, including familiar crabs of the littoral zone, such as the European edible crab (Cancer pagurus), the Jonah crab (Cancer borealis) and the red rock crab (Cancer productus). It is thought to have evolved from related genera in the Pacific Ocean in the Miocene.

== Description ==
The species placed in the genus Cancer are united by the presence of a single posterolateral spine (on the edge of the carapace, towards the rear), anterolateral spines with deep fissures (on the carapace edge, towards the front), and a short extension of the carapace forward between the eyes. Their claws are typically short, with grainy or smooth, rather than spiny, keels. The carapace is typically oval, being 58%–66% as long as wide, and the eyes separated by 22%–29% of the carapace width.

== Species ==
The genus Cancer, as currently circumscribed, contains eight extant species:

Image	Name	Common name	Distribution
	Cancer bellianus Johnson, 1861	toothed rock crab	north-eastern Atlantic Ocean.
Jonah crab NOAA overhead picture	Cancer borealis Stimpson, 1859	Jonah crab	east coast of North America from Newfoundland to Florida.
	Cancer irroratus Say, 1817	Atlantic rock crab	from Iceland to South Carolina
	Cancer johngarthi Carvacho, 1989		eastern Pacific Ocean from Mexico to Panama
	Cancer pagurus Linnaeus, 1758	edible crab or brown crab	the North Sea, North Atlantic Ocean, and perhaps the Mediterranean Sea.
	Cancer plebejus Poeppig, 1836	Chilean crab	Southeast Pacific and Southwest Atlantic: Chile and Peru.
	Cancer porteri Rathbun, 1930	boco	Gulf of Panama to Valparaiso, Chile; Pacific South America.
	Cancer productus J. W. Randall, 1840	red rock crab	Kodiak Island, Alaska to Isla San Martine, Baja California

Three fossil species are also included:

- Cancer fissus Rathbun, 1908 – Pliocene, California
- Cancer fujinaensis Sakumoto, Karasawa & Takayasu, 1992 – Miocene, Japan
- Cancer parvidens Collins & Fraaye, 1991 – Miocene, Netherlands

As their generic delimitation was based on characters of the dorsal carapace, Schweitzer and Feldmann (2000) were unable to confirm the placement of Cancer tomowoi in the genus, since it is known only from parts of the sternum and the legs. Other species until recently included in the genus Cancer have since been transferred to other genera, such as Glebocarcinus, Metacarcinus and Romaleon.

== Taxonomic history ==
When zoological nomenclature was first standardised by Carl Linnaeus in the 1758 10th edition of Systema Naturae, the genus Cancer included almost all crustaceans, including all the crabs. Linnaeus' cumbersome genus was soon divided into more meaningful units, and Cancer had been restricted to one group of true crabs by the time of Pierre André Latreille's 1802 work Histoire naturelle, générale et particulière des Crustacés et des Insectes ("Natural history in general, and specifically that of crustaceans and insects"). Latreille designated C. pagurus to be the type species in 1817.

In 1975, J. Dale Nations divided the genus Cancer into four subgenera: Cancer (Cancer), Cancer (Glebocarcinus), Cancer (Metacarcinus) and Cancer (Romaleon). Each of these is now treated as a separate genus, as is the genus Platepistoma, erected by Mary J. Rathbun and resurrected in 1991. Since that time, further genera have been described to accommodate species previously included in Cancer, and the genus Cancer now contains only eight extant species.

== Evolutionary history ==
The earliest fossils that can be confidently ascribed to the genus Cancer are those of C. fujinaensis from the Japanese Miocene. The genus is therefore thought to have evolved in the northern Pacific Ocean, perhaps during the Miocene, and have spread across that ocean and into the Atlantic Ocean by the Pliocene or Pleistocene, having crossed the equator and the Straits of Panama.
