= Portunus haanii =

Scientific classification
- Kingdom: Animalia
- Phylum: Arthropoda
- Class: Malacostraca
- Order: Decapoda
- Suborder: Pleocyemata
- Infraorder: Brachyura
- Family: Portunidae
- Genus: Portunus
- Species: P. haanii

Binomial name
- Portunus haanii (Stimpson, 1858)

Species of crab

Portunus haanii (swimming crab, red swimming crab, red swimmer crab, or warty swimming crab) is a species of crab. It is a source of commercial crab meat in Vietnam and China.
