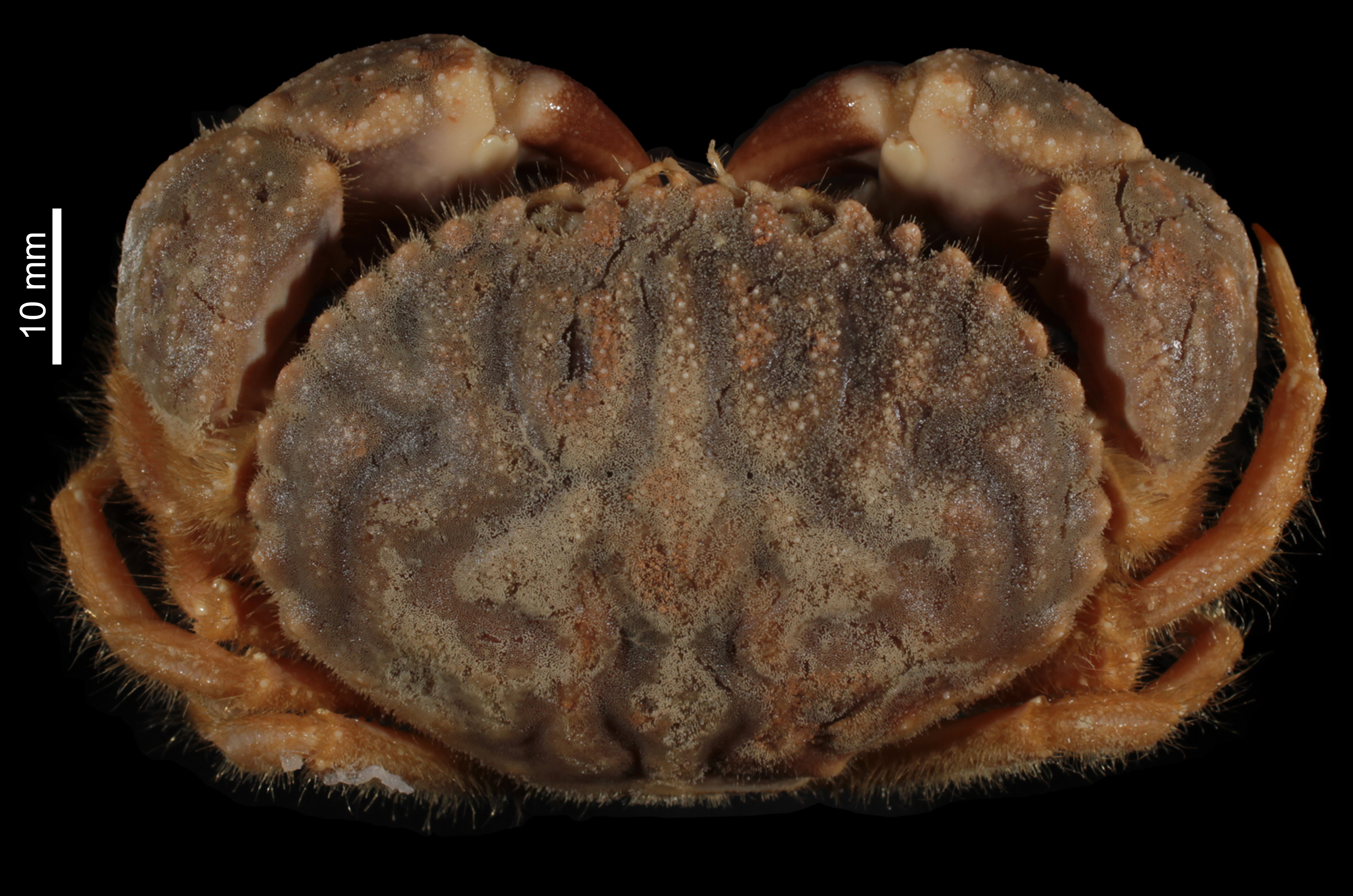
- Platepistoma seychellense

Scientific classification
- Domain: Eukaryota
- Kingdom: Animalia
- Phylum: Arthropoda
- Class: Malacostraca
- Order: Decapoda
- Suborder: Pleocyemata
- Infraorder: Brachyura
- Family: Cancridae
- Genus: Platepistoma; Rathbun, 1906

= Platepistoma =

Genus of crabs

Platepistoma is a genus of crabs.

== Species ==
Included species:

- Platepistoma anaglyptum Balss, 1922
- Platepistoma balssii (Zarenkov, 1990)
- Platepistoma guezei (Crosnier, 1976)
- Platepistoma kiribatiense Davie, 1991
- Platepistoma macrophthalmum Rathbun, 1906
- Platepistoma nanum Davie, 1991
- Platepistoma seani Davie & Ng, 2012
- Platepistoma seychellense Davie, 1991
