= Crab fisheries =

Fisheries which capture or farm crabs

External image
- Distribution map

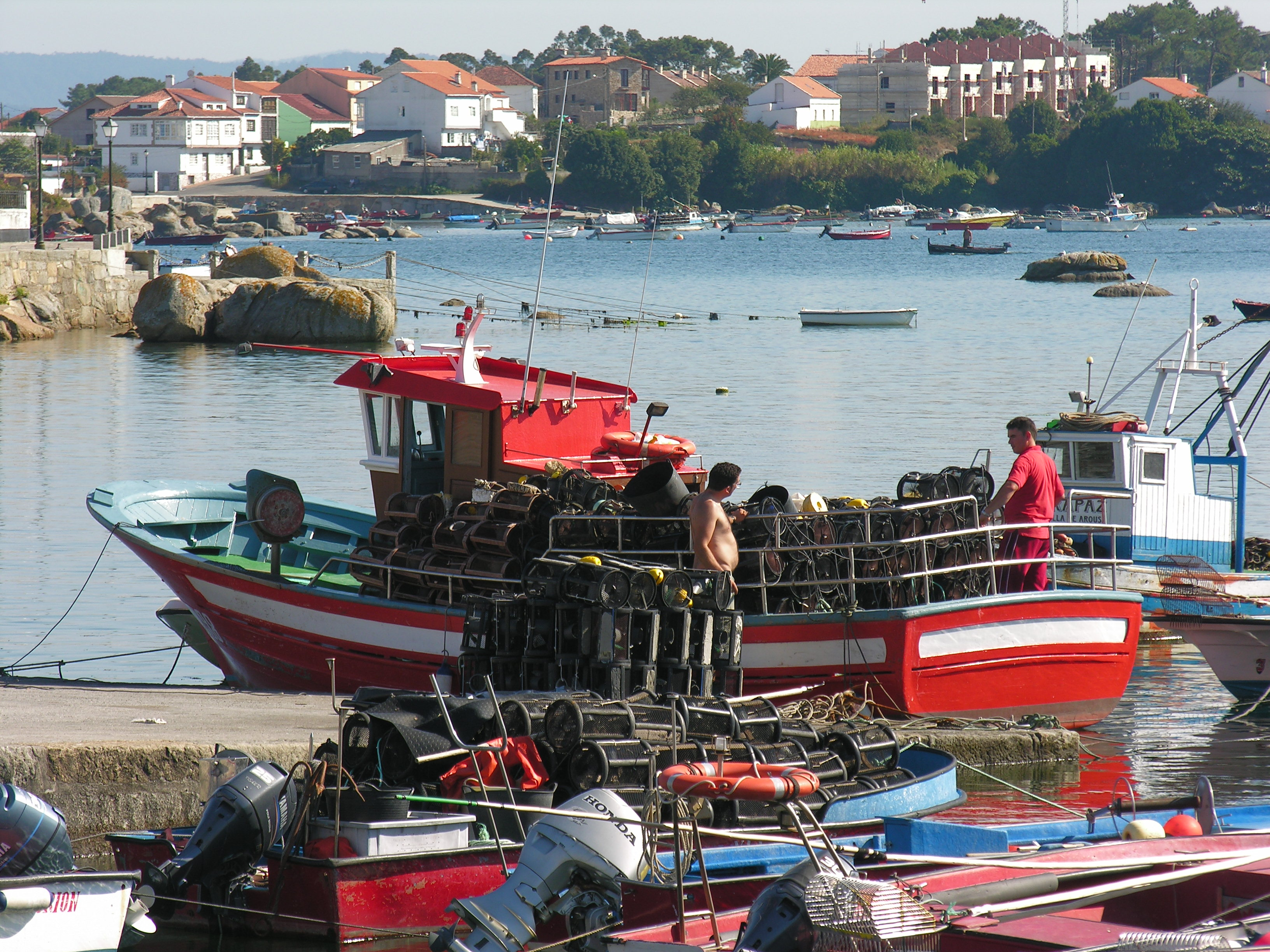
Small crab boat in harbour at A Illa de Arousa, Galicia, Spain

Crab fisheries are fisheries which capture or farm crabs. True crabs make up 20% of all crustaceans caught and farmed worldwide, with about 1.4 million tonnes being consumed annually. The horse crab, Portunus trituberculatus, accounts for one quarter of that total. Other important species include flower crabs (Portunus pelagicus), snow crabs (Chionoecetes), blue crabs (Callinectes sapidus), edible or brown crabs (Cancer pagurus), Dungeness crab (Metacarcinus magister), and mud crabs (Scylla serrata), each of which provides more than 20,000 tonnes annually.

== Commercial catch ==
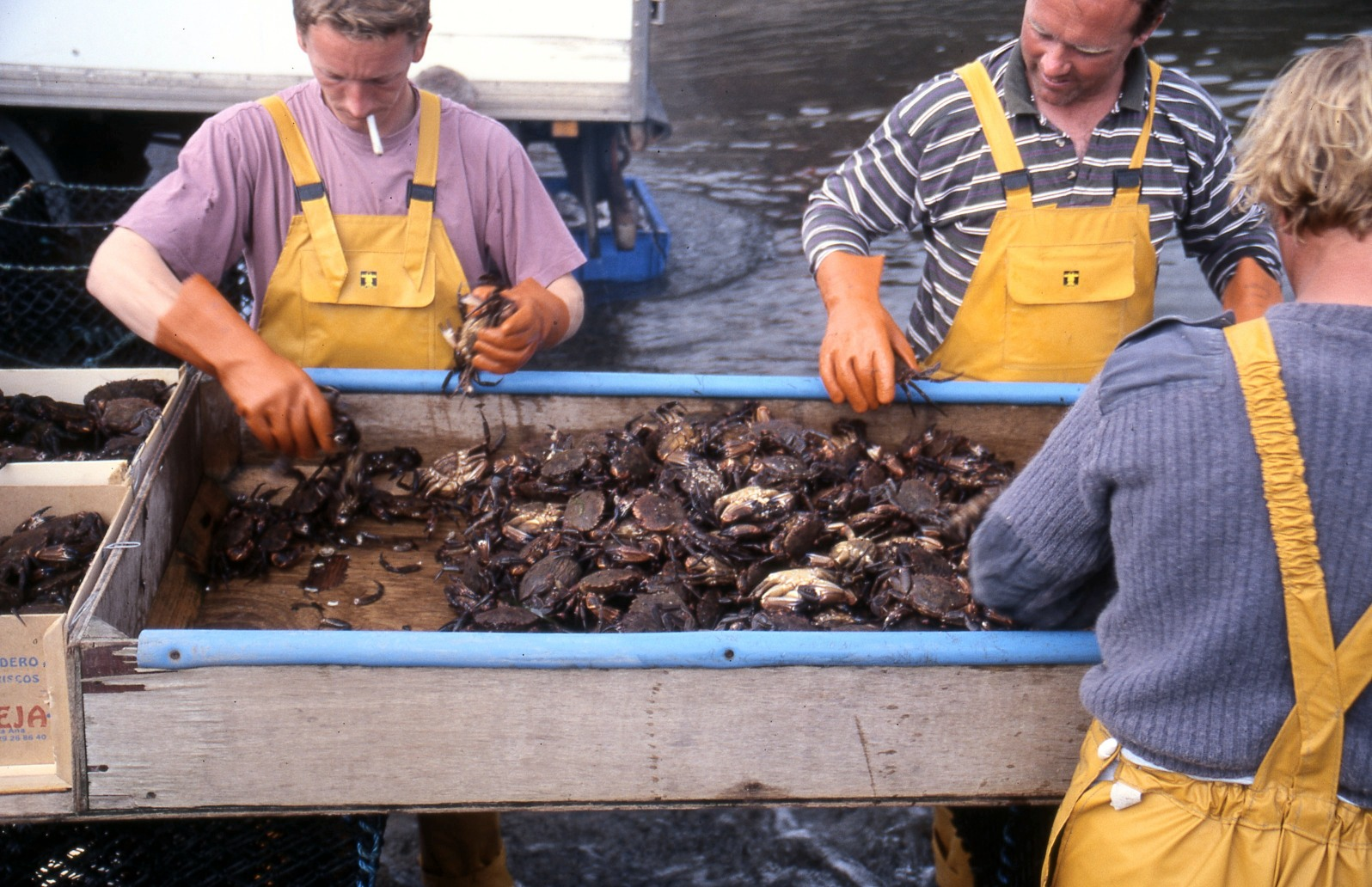
Fishermen sorting velvet crab at Fionnphort, Scotland

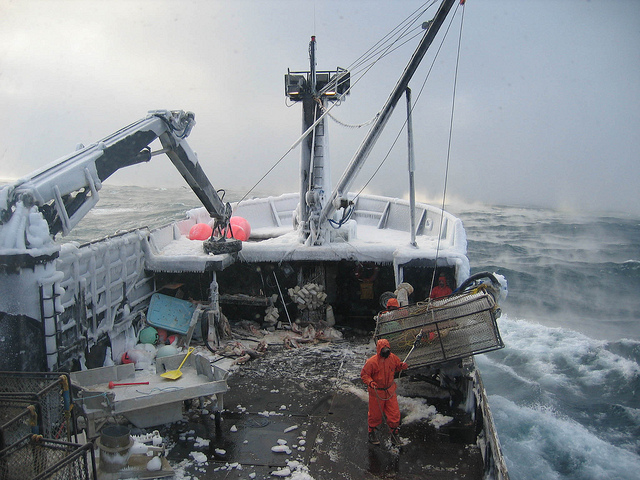
Boat fishing for crabs in the Bering Sea.

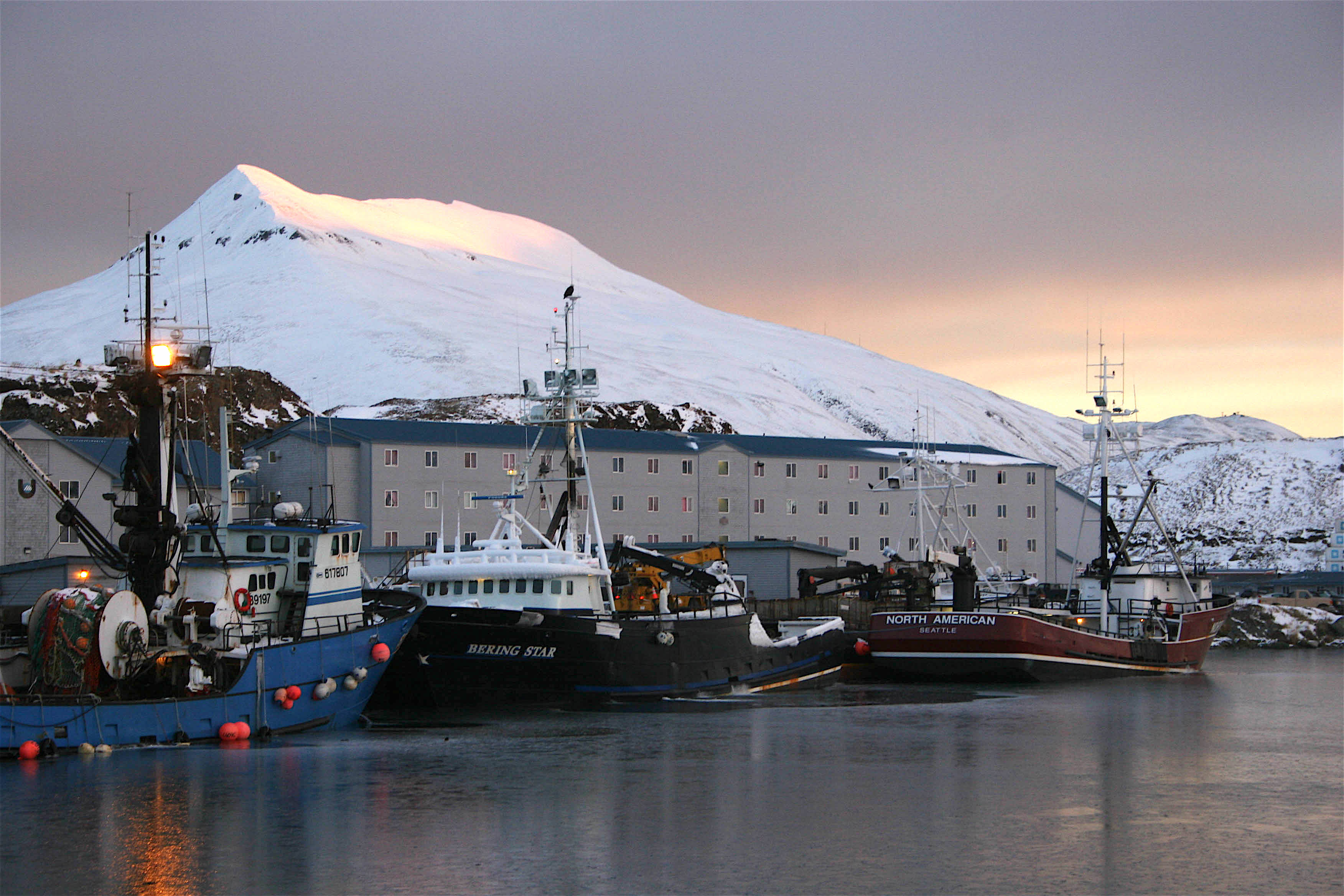
Crab boats moored in Dutch Harbor, Alaska

The FAO groups fishery catches using the ISSCAAP classification (International Standard Statistical Classification of Aquatic Animals and Plants). ISSCAAP has a group for crabs and sea-spiders, and another group for king crabs and squat lobsters.

- Crabs and sea-spiders are defined as including "Atlantic rock crab, black stone crab, blue crab, blue swimming crab, dana swimcrab, dungeness crab, edible crab, cazami crab, geryons nei, green crab, hair crab, harbour spidercrab, Indo-Pacific swamp crab, jonah crab, marine crabs nei, Mediterranean shore crab, Pacific rock crab, portunus swimcrabs nei, queen crab, red crab, spinous spider crab, swimcrabs nei, and tanner crabs nei". (Note: "Nei" is an abbreviation for "not elsewhere included".)

The following table summarises crab production from 2000 to 2008, both caught wild and from aquaculture, in tonnes.

Commercial crab production in tonnes
Group	2000	2001	2002	2003	2004	2005	2006	2007	2008
Capture	1,046,269	1,034,898	1,061,697	1,246,889	1,252,260	1,233,523	1,302,069	1,300,559	1,319,953
Aquaculture	125,501	145,130	171,979	167,533	178,838	195,995	198,258	231,065	240,781
Total	1,171,770	1,180,028	1,233,676	1,414,422	1,431,098	1,429,518	1,500,327	1,531,624	1,560,734

== Commercially important crab species ==
Species	Description	Global catch in thousand tonnes reported by the FAO
Portunus trituberculatus	Portunus trituberculatus, known as the horse crab, known as the gazami crab or Japanese blue crab, is the most widely fished species of crab in the world, with over 300,000 tonnes being caught annually, 98% of it off the coast of China. Horse crabs are found from Hokkaidō to South India, throughout Maritime Southeast Asia and south to Australia. In Malay, it is known as ketam bunga or "flower crab". It lives on shallow sandy or muddy bottoms, less than 50 m deep, where it feeds on seaweeds and predates upon small fish, worms and bivalves. The carapace may reach 15 cm (5.9 in) wide, and 7 cm (2 3/4 in) from front to back.	Portunus trituberculatus
Portunus pelagicus	Portunus pelagicus (known as flower crabs, blue crabs, blue swimmer crabs, blue manna crabs or sand crabs) is a large crab found in the intertidal estuaries of the Indian and Pacific Oceans (Asian coasts) and the Middle-Eastern coast of the Mediterranean Sea. The name flower crab is used in east Asian countries while the latter names are used in Australia. The crabs are widely distributed in eastern Africa, Southeast Asia, Japan, Australia and New Zealand. The carapace can be up to 20 cm wide. They stay buried under sand or mud most of the time, particularly during the daytime and winter. The species is commercially important throughout the Indo-Pacific where they may be sold as traditional hard shells, or as "soft shelled" crabs, which are considered a delicacy throughout Asia. The species is highly prized as the meat is almost as sweet as the blue crab, although P. pelagicus is physically much larger.	Portunus pelagicus
Chionoecetes	Species of Chionoecetes (known as Tanner Crabs, Snow Crabs, Spider Crabs, and other names) live in the cold waters of the northern Pacific and Atlantic Ocean. Snow crab are caught as far north as the Arctic Ocean, from Newfoundland to Greenland in the Atlantic Ocean, and across the Pacific Ocean, including the Sea of Japan, the Bering Sea, the Gulf of Alaska, Norton Sound, and even as far south as California for Chionoecetes bairdi. Fishing for opilio (and rarely bairdi) crab has been the focus of the second half of all four seasons of Deadliest Catch on the Discovery Channel.	Chionoecetes opilio
Callinectes sapidus	The Chesapeake Bay, located in Maryland and Virginia, is famous for its "blue crabs", Callinectes sapidus. In 1993, the combined harvest of the blue crabs was valued at around 100 million U.S. dollars. Over the years the harvests of the blue crab dropped; in 2000, the combined harvest was around 45 million dollars. While blue crabs remain a popular food in the Chesapeake Bay area, the Bay is not capable of meeting local demand. Crabs are shipped into the region from North Carolina, Louisiana, Florida and Texas to supplement the local harvest.	Callinectes sapidus
Cancer pagurus	Cancer pagurus, the edible crab or brown crab, is a species found in the North Sea, North Atlantic and the Mediterranean Sea. It is a robust crab of a reddish-brown colour, having an oval carapace with a characteristic "pie crust" edge and black tips to the claws. Mature adults may have a carapace width of up to about 25 cm and weigh up to 3 kg. The edible crab is abundant throughout the northeast Atlantic as far as Norway in the north and northern Africa in the south, on mixed coarse grounds, mud and sand from shallow sublittoral to about 100 m. It is frequently found inhabiting cracks and holes in rocks but occasionally also in open areas. Smaller specimens may be found under rocks in the littoral zone. Edible crabs are exploited commercially throughout their range. It is illegal to catch crabs of too small a size around the coast of Britain, a conservation measure brought in the 1870s. Crabs with a shell diameter of less than 100 mm should not be taken.	Cancer pagurus
Metacarcinus magister	The Dungeness crab (Metacarcinus magister) inhabits eelgrass beds and water bottoms from the Aleutian Islands in Alaska to Santa Cruz, California. Its binomial name, Cancer magister, simply means "master crab" in Latin. They measure as much as 25 cm (9.8 in) in some areas off the coast of Washington, but typically are under 20 cm (7.9 in). (Note: Crabs are measured across the widest part of their back, excluding the legs. See, e.g., 2006-2007 Fishing in Washington Rule Pamphlet (pdf), p. 130.) They are a popular delicacy, and are the most commercially important crab in the Pacific Northwest, as well as the western states generally. They are named after Dungeness, Washington, which is located approximately five miles north of Sequim and 15 miles east of Port Angeles. The annual Dungeness Crab and Seafood Festival is held in Port Angeles each October. Dungeness crab have recently been found in the Atlantic Ocean, far from their known range, raising concern about their possible effects on the local wildlife.	Cancer magister
Scylla serrata	Scylla serrata (known as mud crab, or more ambiguously as mangrove crab or black crab) is an economically important crab species found in the estuaries and mangroves of Africa, Australia and Asia. In their most common form, the shell colour varies from a deep, mottled green to very dark brown. Generally cooked with their shells on, when they moult their shells, they can be served as a seafood delicacy, one of many types of soft shell crab. They are among the tastiest crab species and have a huge demand in South Asian countries where they are often bought alive in the markets. In the northern states of Australia and especially Queensland, mud crabs are relatively common and generally prized above other seafood within the general public.	Scylla serrata
Maja squinado	Maja squinado (European spider crabs) are a species of migratory crabs found in the north-east Atlantic and the Mediterranean Sea. They are the subject of commercial fishery, with about 5,000 tonnes caught annually, 70% off the coast of France, 10% off the coast of the United Kingdom, 6% from the Channel Islands, 3% from each of Spain and Ireland, 2% from Croatia, 1% from Portugal, and the remainder from Serbia and Montenegro, Denmark and Morocco, although official production figures are open to doubt. The European Union imposes a minimum landing size of 120 mm for M. squinado, and some individual countries have other regulations, such as a ban on landing egg-bearing females in Spain and a closed season in France and the Channel Islands.	
Cancer borealis	Cancer borealis, known as the Jonah crab, is a species of crab native to the east coast of North America from Newfoundland south to Florida, and thus found in waters ranging from subarctic to subtropical. It is found seasonally inshore on the continental shelf, moving to depths up to 750m in autumn. Once considered as bycatch to lobster fishing, it has become an emerging fishery with the catch increasing from about 900 tonnes in 2000 to about 6,000 tonnes in 2014. Most are caught in New England. In 2016, NOAA and the Atlantic States Marine Fisheries Commission established a fisheries management plan for the species.	

== See also ==
- Alaskan king crab fishing
- Crab trap
- List of harvested aquatic animals by weight
