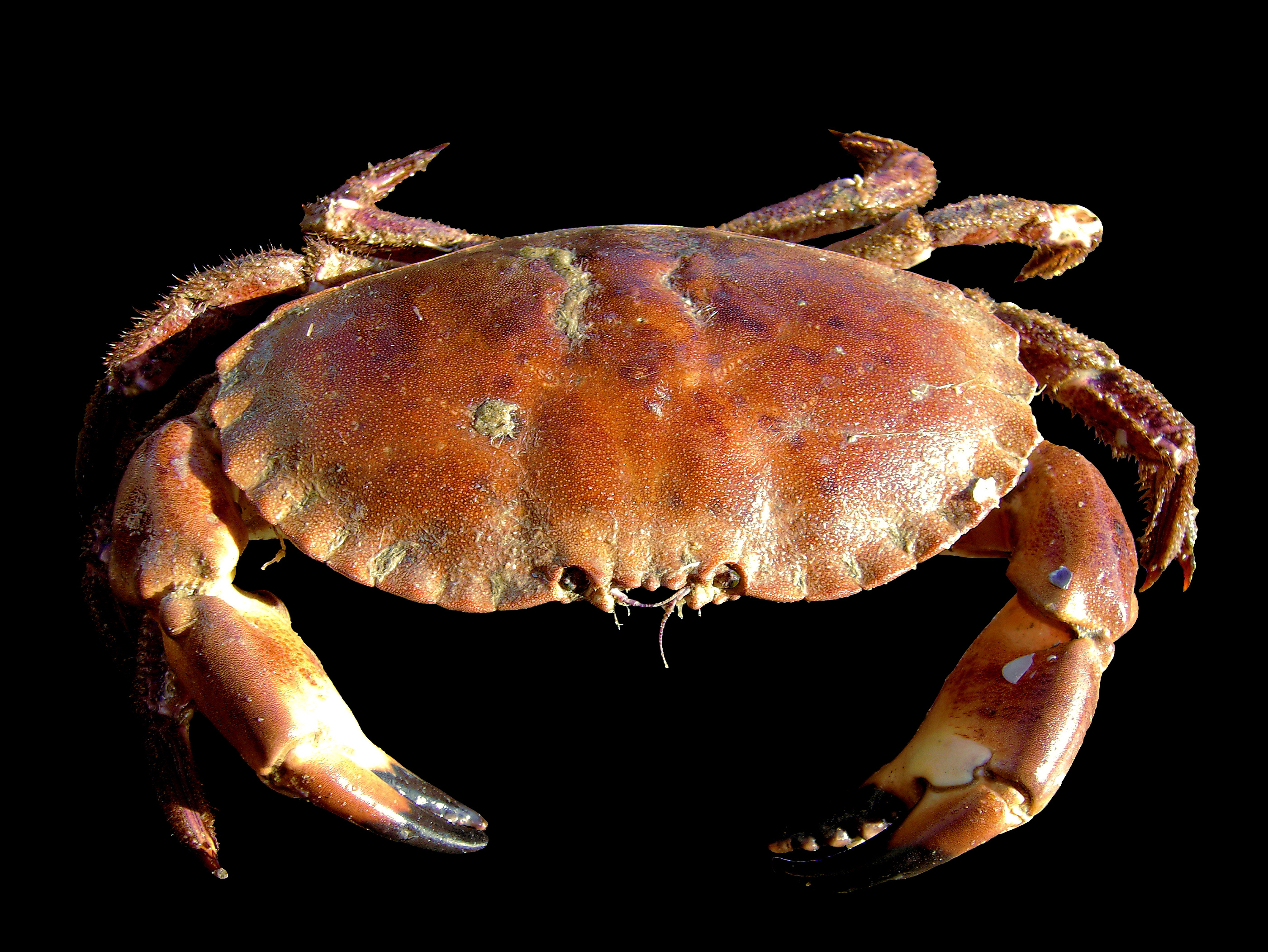

Scientific classification
- Kingdom: Animalia
- Phylum: Arthropoda
- Clade: Pancrustacea
- Class: Malacostraca
- Order: Decapoda
- Suborder: Pleocyemata
- Infraorder: Brachyura
- Family: Cancridae
- Genus: Cancer
- Species: C. pagurus

Binomial name
- Cancer pagurus Linnaeus, 1758

Synonyms
- Cancer fimbriatus Olivi, 1792; Platycarcinus pagurus H. Milne-Edwards, 1834; Platycarcinus pagurus Couch, 1838; Cancer luederwaldti Rathbun, 1930

= Cancer pagurus =

Species of crustacean

Cancer pagurus, commonly known as the edible crab or brown crab, is a species of crab found in the North Sea, North Atlantic Ocean, and perhaps the Mediterranean Sea. It is a robust crab of a reddish-brown colour, having an oval carapace with a characteristic "pie crust" edge and black tips to the claws. A mature adult may have a carapace width up to 25 centimetres (10 inches) and weigh up to 3 kilograms (6 1/2 pounds). C. pagurus is a nocturnal predator, targeting a range of molluscs and crustaceans. It is the subject of the largest crab fishery in Western Europe, centred on the coasts of Ireland and Britain, with more than 60,000 tonnes caught annually.

== Description ==
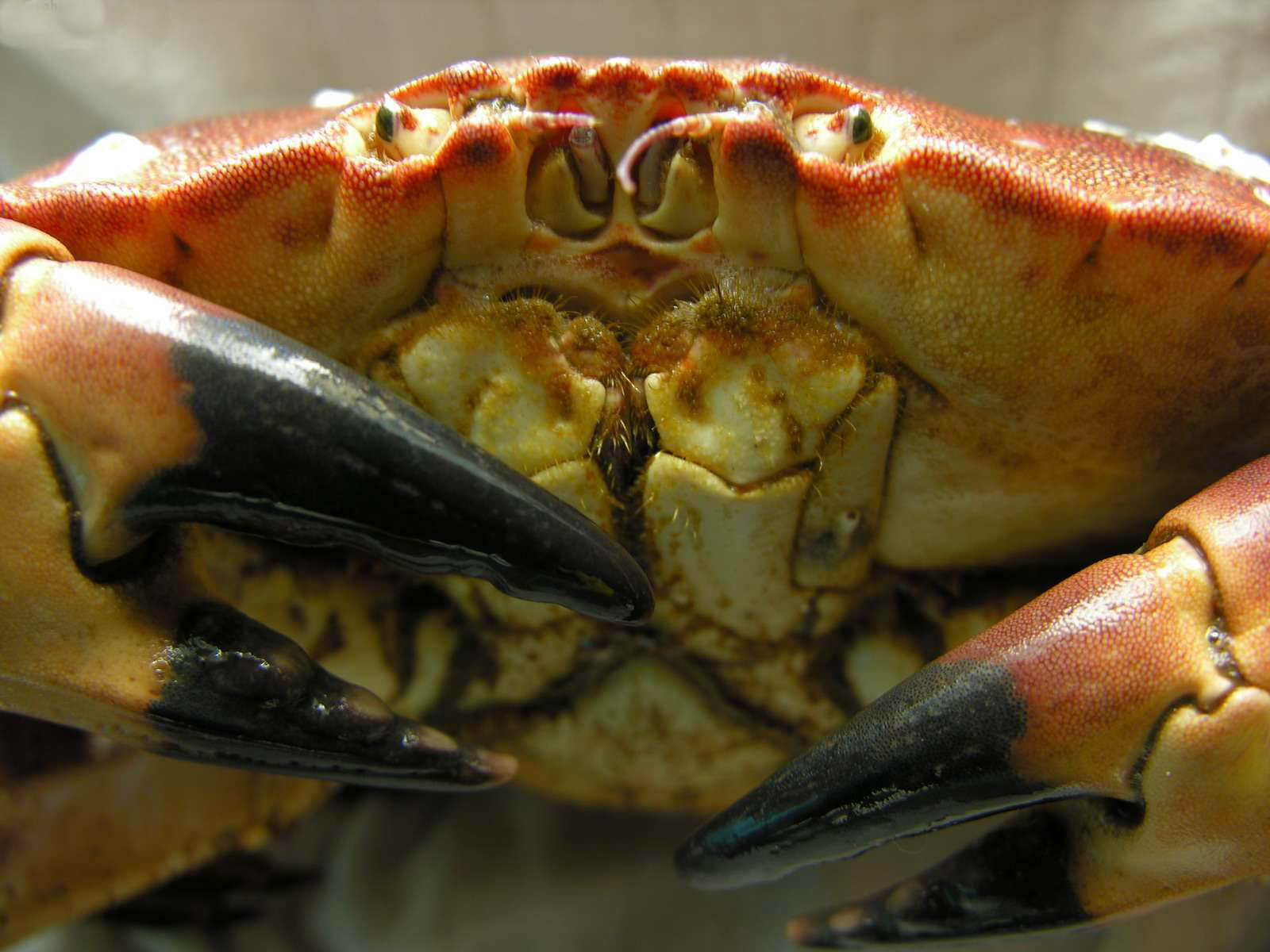
Mouthparts and chelae of a female

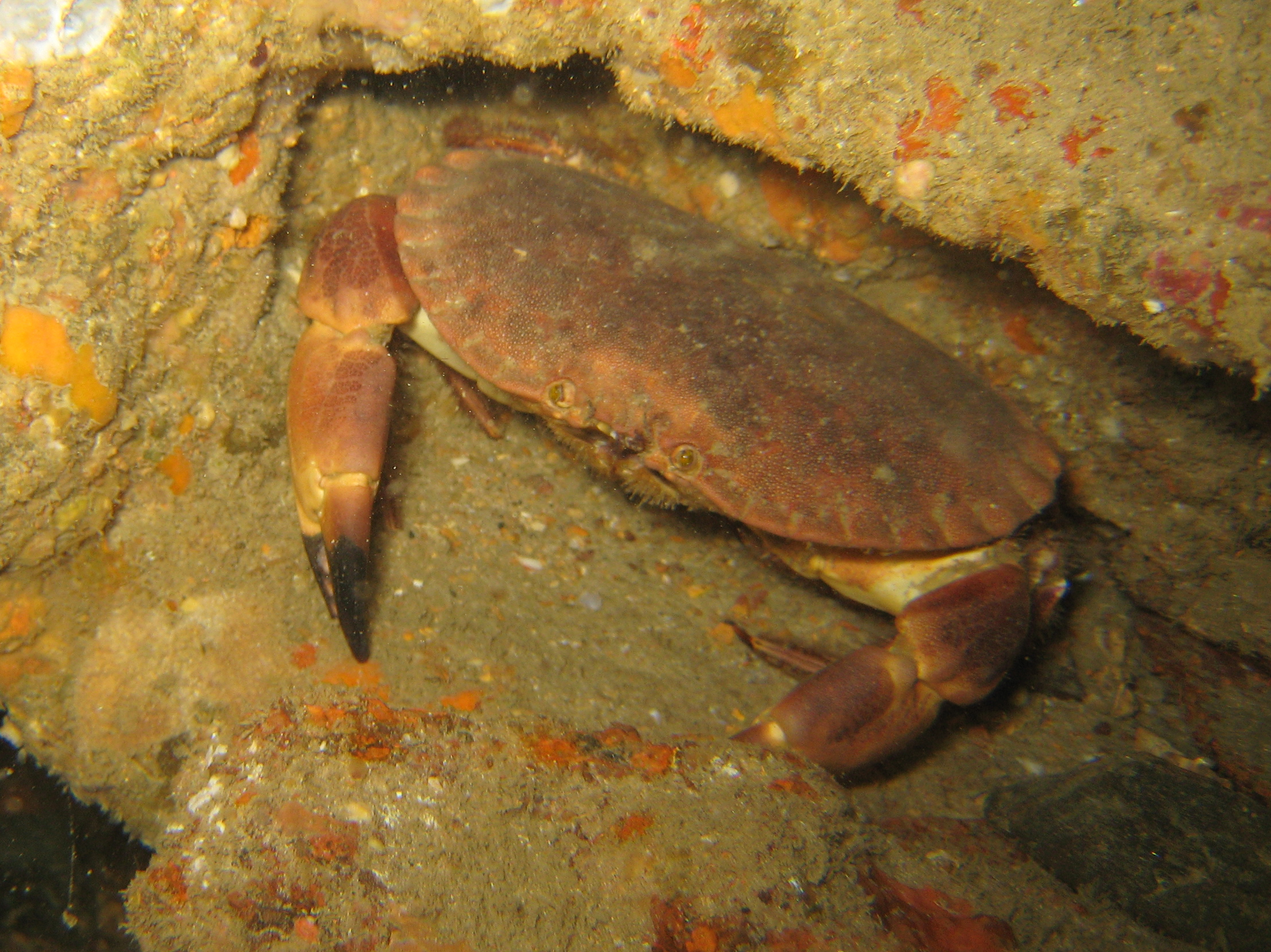

The carapace of C. pagurus adults is a reddish-brown colour, while in young specimens it is purple-brown. It occasionally bears white patches, and is shaped along the front edge into nine rounded lobes, resembling a pie crust. Males typically have a carapace 60 mm (2 1/4 in) long, and females 98 mm (3 3/4 in) long, although they may reach up to 150 mm (6 in) long in exceptional cases. Carapace width is typically 150 mm (6 in), or exceptionally up to 250 mm (9 3/4 in). A fold of the carapace extends ventrally to constitute a branchial chamber where the gills lie.

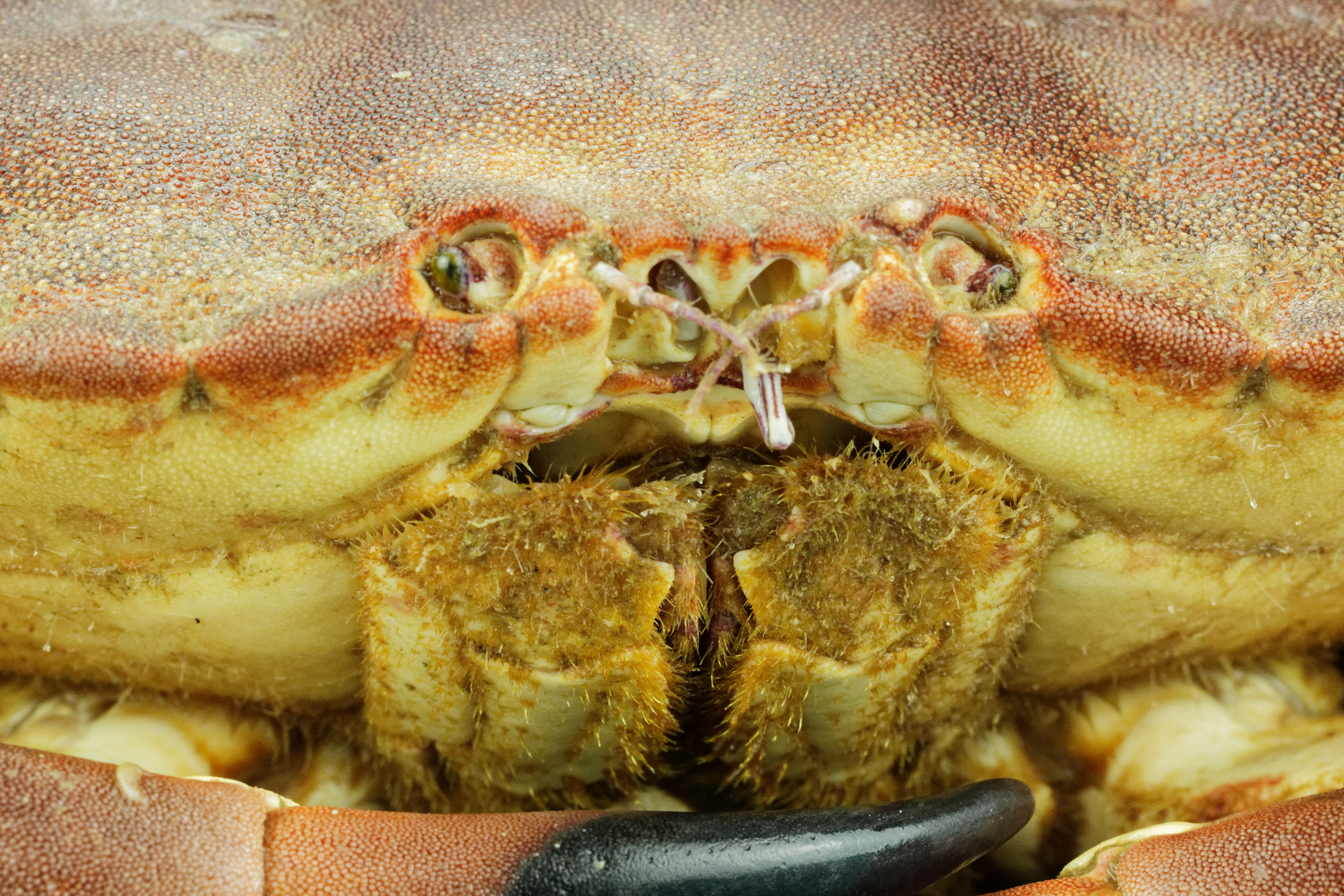
The close-up

The first pereiopod is modified into a strong cheliped (claw-bearing leg); the claw's fingers, the dactylus and propodus, are black at the tips. The other pereiopods are covered with rows of short stiff setae; the dactylus of each is black towards the tip, and ends in a sharp point.

From the front, the antennae and antennules are visible. Beside these, the orbits are where the eyes are situated. The mouthparts comprise three pairs of maxillipeds, behind which are a pair of maxillae, a pair of maxillules, and finally the mandibles.

== Life cycle ==
Reproduction occurs in winter; the male stands over the female and forms a cage with his legs protecting her while she moults. Internal fertilisation takes place before the hardening of the new carapace, with the aid of two abdominal appendages (gonopods). After mating, the female retreats to a pit on the sea floor to lay her eggs. Between 250,000 and 3,000,000 fertilised eggs are held under the female's abdomen up to eight months until they hatch.

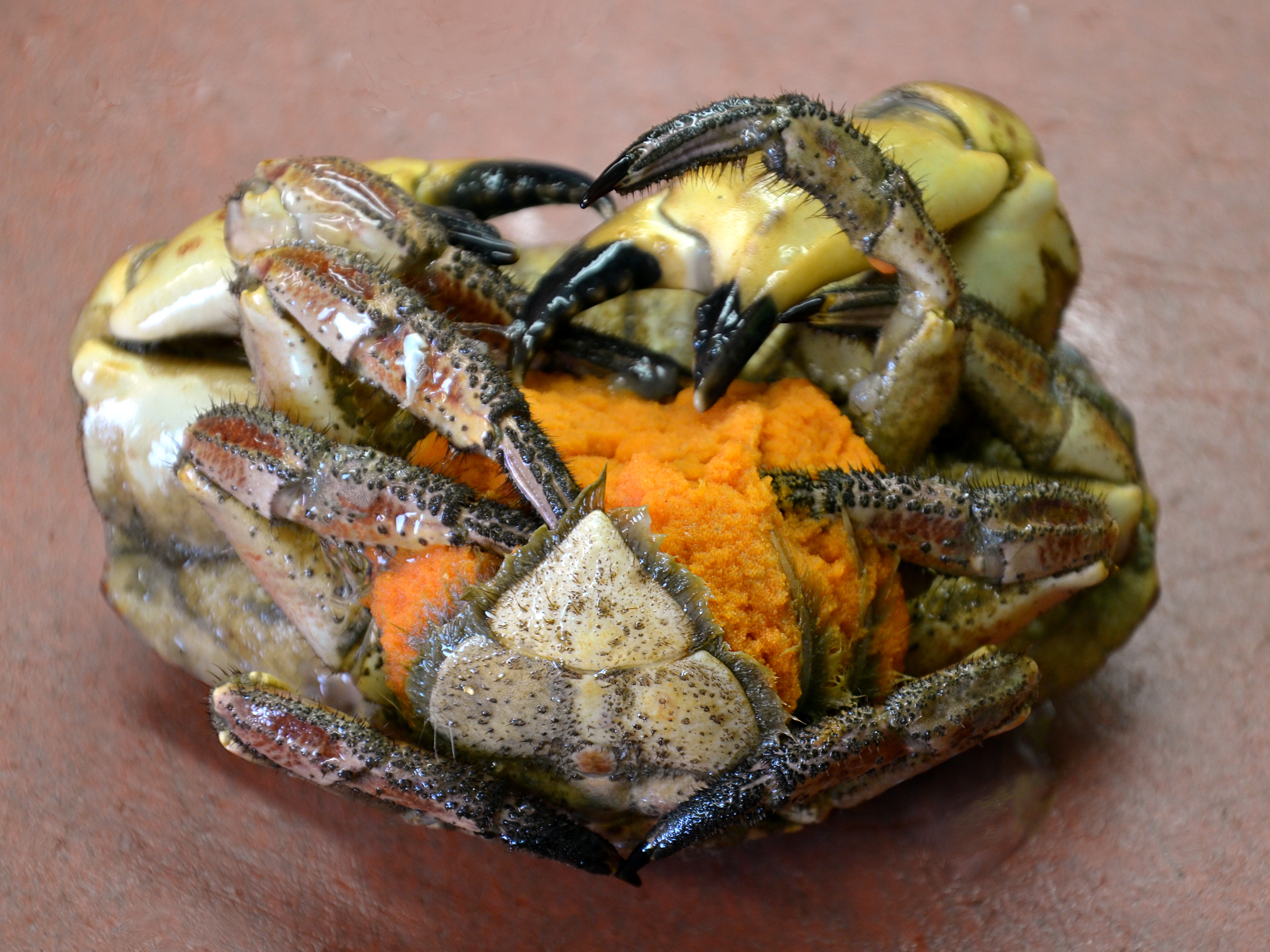
A female edible crab with eggs on scrap

The first developmental stage after hatching is a planktonic larva (1 mm) called the zoea that develops into a postlarva (megalopa), and finally a juvenile. The first juvenile stage is characterised by a well-developed abdomen, which in time becomes reduced in size and folded under the sternum. Juveniles settle to the sea floor in the intertidal zone, where they stay until they reach a carapace width of 60–70 mm (2 3/8–2 3/4 in), and then migrate to deeper water. The growth rate in males slows from an increase in carapace width of 10 mm per year before it is 8 years old, to 2 mm per year thereafter. Females grow at about half the rate of males, probably due to the energetic demands of egg laying. Sexual maturity is reached at a carapace width of 127 mm (5 in) in females, and 110 mm (4 3/8 in) in males. Longevity is typically 25–30 years, although exceptional individuals may live up to 100 years.

== Distribution and ecology ==
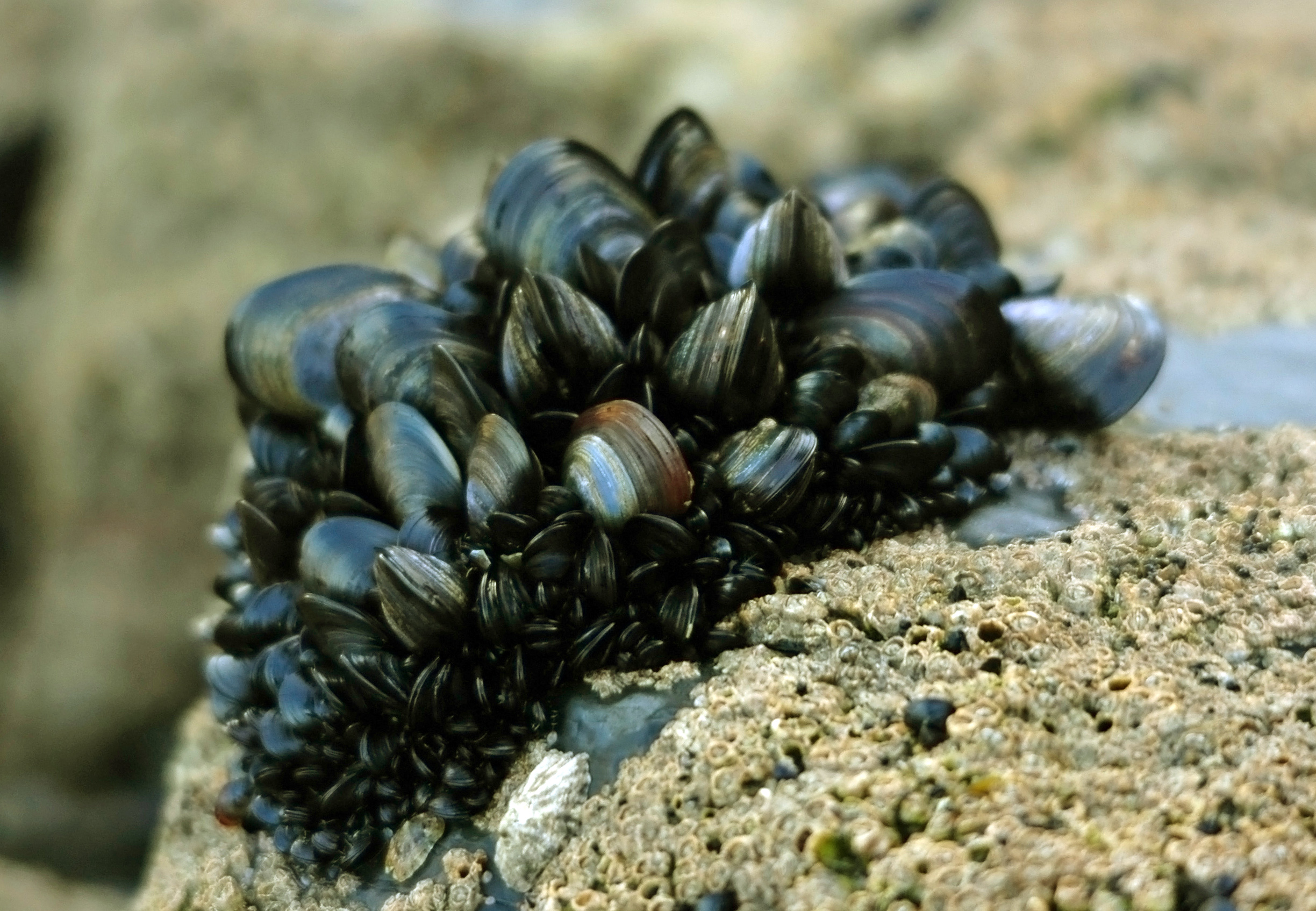
The blue mussel, Mytilus edulis, is a favourite food of C. pagurus

C. pagurus is abundant throughout the northeast Atlantic as far as Norway in the north and North Africa in the south, on mixed coarse grounds, mud, and sand from the shallow sublittoral to depths around 100 m (300 ft; 50 fathoms). It is frequently found inhabiting cracks and holes in rocks, but occasionally also in open areas. Smaller specimens may be found under rocks in the littoral zone. Unconfirmed reports suggest that C. pagurus may also occur in the Mediterranean Sea and Black Sea.

Adults of C. pagurus are nocturnal, hiding buried in the substrate during the day, but foraging at night up to 50 m (150 ft) from their hideouts. Their diet includes a variety of crustaceans (including the crabs Carcinus maenas and Pilumnus hirtellus, the porcelain crabs Porcellana platycheles and Pisidia longicornis, and the squat lobster Galathea squamifera) and molluscs (including the gastropods Nucella lapillus and Littorina littorea, and the bivalves Ensis, Mytilus edulis, Cerastoderma edule, Ostrea edulis, and Lutraria lutraria). It may stalk or ambush motile prey, and may dig large pits to reach buried molluscs. The main predator of C. pagurus is the octopus, which even attacks them inside the crab pots that fishermen use to trap them.

=== Diseases ===
Compared to other commercially important crab species, relatively little is known about diseases of C. pagurus. Its parasites include viruses, such as the white spot syndrome virus, various bacteria that cause dark lesions on the exoskeleton, and Hematodinium-like dinoflagellates that cause "pink crab disease". Other microscopic pathogens include fungi, microsporidians, paramyxeans, and ciliates. C. pagurus is also targeted by metazoan parasites, including trematodes and parasitic barnacles. A number of sessile animals occasionally settle as epibionts on the exoskeleton of C. pagurus, including barnacles, sea anemones, serpulid polychaetes such as Janua pagenstecheri, bryozoans, and saddle oysters.

== Fishery ==
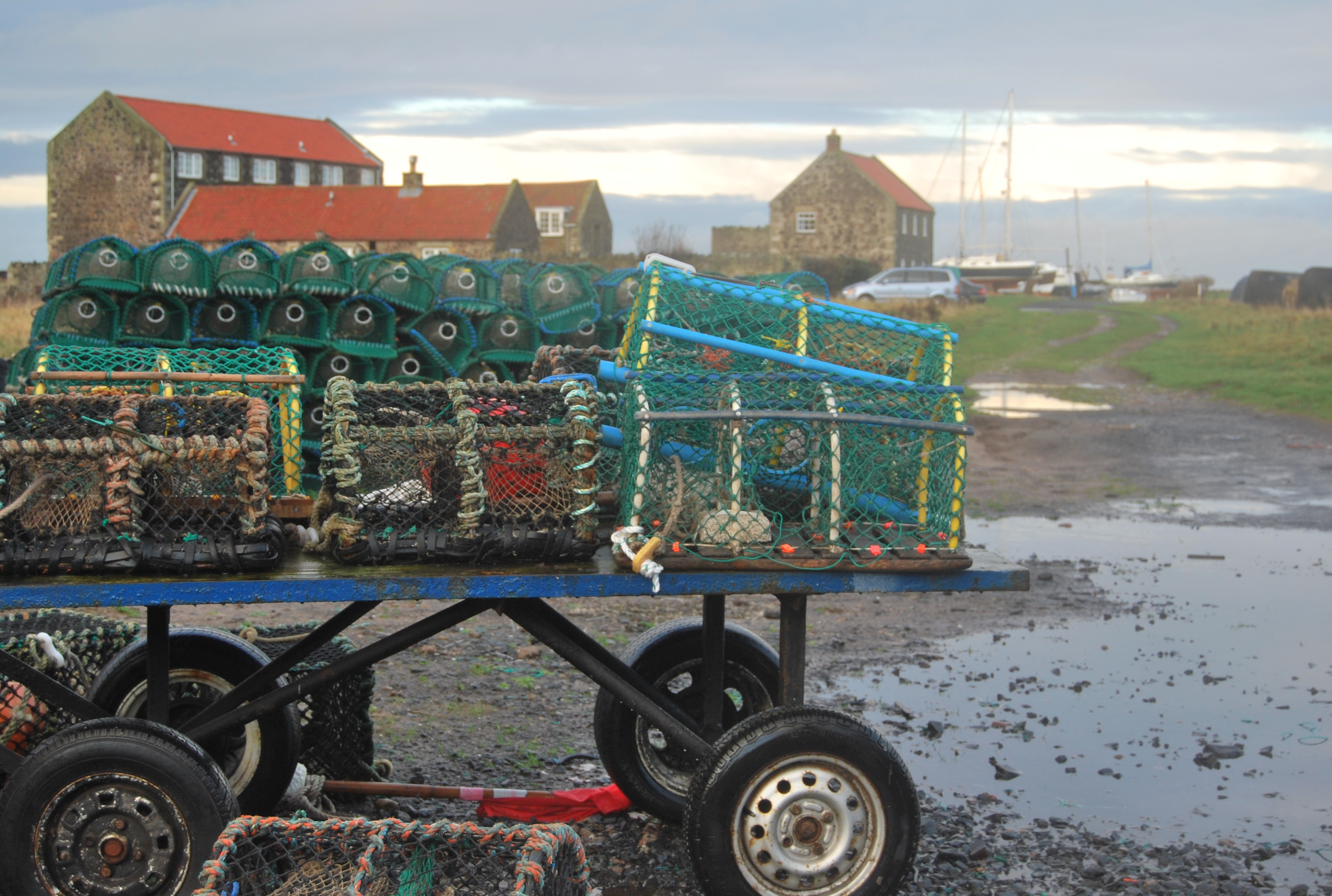
Crab pots, Lindisfarne, North Sea

C. pagurus is heavily exploited commercially throughout its range, being the most commercially important crab species in Western Europe. The crabs are caught using crab pots (similar to lobster pots), also known as creels, which are placed offshore and baited. The catch of C. pagurus has increased steadily, rising from 26,000 tonnes in 1978 to 60,000 t in 2007, of which more than 70% was caught around the British Isles. The fishery is widely dispersed around the British and Irish coasts, and C. pagurus is thought to be overfished across much of this area. Most of the edible crabs caught by the British fleet are exported live for sale in France and Spain.

A number of legal restrictions apply to the catching of C. pagurus. Catching "berried" crabs (females carrying eggs) is illegal, but since ovigerous females remain in pits dug in the sediment and do not feed, fishing pressure does not affect the supply of larvae. Minimum landing sizes (MLSs) for C. pagurus are set by both the European Union technical regulations and by the UK government. Different minimum sizes are employed in different geographical areas, to reflect differences in the crab's growth rate across its range. In particular, the "Cromer crab" fishery along the coasts of Suffolk, Norfolk and Lincolnshire is subject to an MLS of 115 mm (4 1/2 in), rather than the 140 mm (5 1/2 in) MLS in most of the species' range. An intermediate value of 130 mm (5 1/8 in) is used in the rest of the North Sea between the 56°N and the Essex–Kent border, and in the Irish Sea south of 55°N. Around Devon, Cornwall, and the Isles of Scilly, the MLS for males is different (160 mm or 6 1/4 in) from females (140 mm or 5 1/2 in). The Norwegian catch is 8,500 tons annually, compared to 20,000 tons in the United Kingdom, 13,000 tons in Ireland, 8,500 tons in France, and a total 45,000 tons globally. Recent studies have shown that edible crabs are negatively affected by electromagnetic fields emitted from sub-sea power cables around offshore wind farms.

== Cookery ==
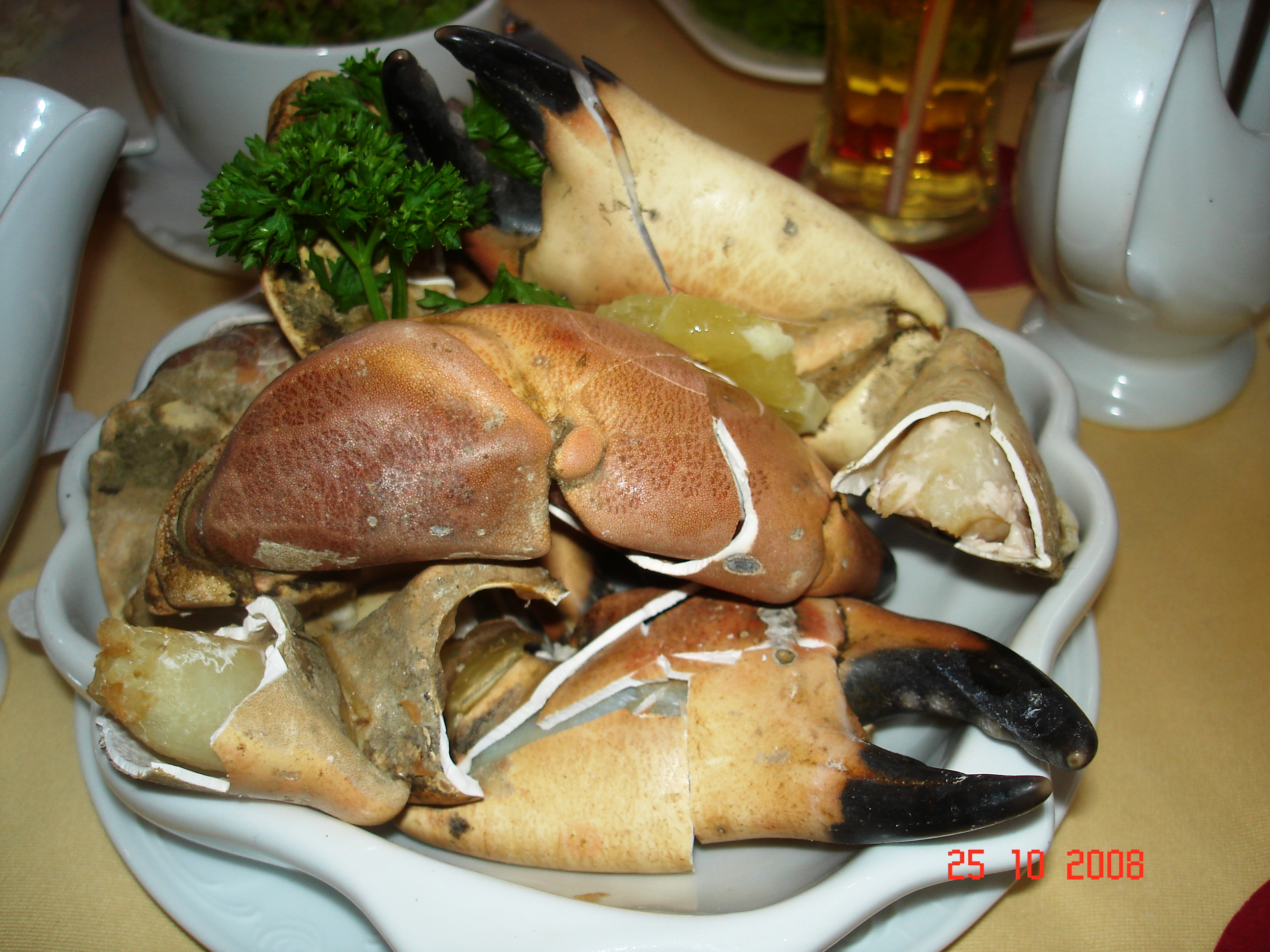
The cooked claws of edible crab

Around one-third of the weight of an adult edible crab is meat, of which one-third is white meat from the claws (see declawing of crabs), and two-thirds is white and brown meat from the body. As food, male edible crabs are referred to as cocks and females as hens. Cocks have more sweet white meat; hens have more rich brown meat. Dishes include dressed crab (crab meat arranged in the cleaned shell, sometimes with decoration of other foodstuffs), soups such as bisque or bouillabaisse, pâtés, mousses, and hot soufflés.

Historic evidence of human consumption of brown crabs dates to the Middle Pleistocene during the Last Interglacial, where the Neanderthal site at Gruta da Figueira Brava, Portugal, shows evidence of substantial harvesting and consumption of the species.

== Taxonomy and systematics ==
According to the rules of the International Code of Zoological Nomenclature, Cancer pagurus was first described by Carl Linnaeus in 1758, in the tenth edition of his Systema Naturae, which marks the starting point of zoological nomenclature. It was chosen to be the type species of the genus Cancer by Pierre André Latreille in 1810. The specific epithet pagurus is a Latin word, deriving from the Ancient Greek: πάγουρος (pagouros), which, alongside κάρκινος (karkinos), was used to refer to edible marine crabs; neither classical term can be confidently assigned to a particular species.

Although the genus Cancer formerly included most crabs, it has since been restricted to eight species. The closest relative of C. pagurus is the Jonah crab, C. borealis, from the east coast of North America.
