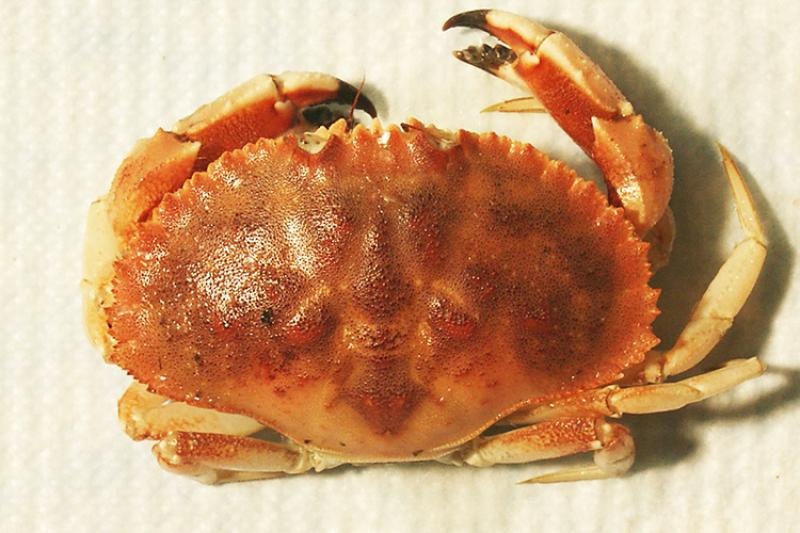

Conservation status
- Secure (NatureServe)

Scientific classification
- Kingdom: Animalia
- Phylum: Arthropoda
- Clade: Pancrustacea
- Class: Malacostraca
- Order: Decapoda
- Suborder: Pleocyemata
- Infraorder: Brachyura
- Family: Cancridae
- Genus: Cancer
- Species: C. borealis

Binomial name
- Cancer borealis Stimpson, 1859

= Jonah crab =

Species of crab

The Jonah crab (Cancer borealis) is a marine brachyuran crab that inhabits waters along the east coast of North America from Newfoundland to Florida. Jonah crabs possess a rounded, rough-edged carapace with small light spots, and robust claws with dark brown-black tips. The maximum reported carapace width for males is 8.7 in (222 mm), while females rarely exceed 5.9 in (150 mm). It is the closest relative to the European brown crab in the Western Atlantic.

== Growth and reproduction ==
Males and females grow at about the same rate before reaching a carapace width of 1.2–1.6 in (30–40 mm), which is about the size of gonadal sexual maturity. After this point, females grow more slowly than males. Males tend to mature at a smaller size than females, but only reach functional sexual maturity at around 5.02 in (127.6 mm), when they are capable of engaging in the copulatory embrace. Size at gonadal maturity is greater for populations at higher latitudes.

A study in Rhode Island Sound found a discrete molting season in June for smaller (carapace width less than 4.7 in (120 mm)) male Jonah crabs. With each successive molt, post-molt width increments decreased for female crabs and increased for male crabs. Male crabs in Rhode Island Sound with carapace widths above 4.7 in (120 mm) were unlikely to molt. It is possible that Jonah crabs migrate from the area before becoming larger, as larger crabs are more frequently found further offshore.

Mating occurs after female ecdysis and sperm can be stored indefinitely. Spawning generally takes place inshore. Spawning season occurs later in the year for populations at higher latitudes, occurring in the early spring in the Mid-Atlantic Bight and in the fall in Maine. Eggs are brooded for 5–6 months before hatching. After a period in the plankton as zoea, megalopa settle in the subtidal zone with no clear preference between cobble and sand substrates.

== Habitat and behavior ==
Jonah crabs have been reported at depths of up to 2,460 ft (750 m). Habitat preferences for Cancer borealis range from rocky substrate in Rhode Island and the Gulf of Maine to silt and clay substrate on the continental slope. It is widely accepted that this species moves offshore in the fall and winter, and females have been documented moving inshore in late spring and summer. The Jonah crab is known to move to areas of preferred temperature for behavioral thermoregulation. The preferred temperature of this animal changes depending on the temperature to which it is acclimated. The estimated average preferred temperature is 59.7 °F (15.4 °C). Because Jonah crabs are a strongly preferred prey item for gulls, their survivorship is highest in deep water. However, some crabs will forage at shallower depths and in the intertidal zone, where food is more abundant. Due to the increased growth rate of crabs who forage at shallow depths and the higher survivorship of crabs who forage in deep water, both behaviors have roughly equivalent effect on fitness.

In contrast to that of smaller, more agile blue crabs and rock crabs, the predation style of Jonah crabs has been likened to that of lobsters, relying on brute crushing force. As a result, they are able to feed on large mussels and periwinkles inaccessible to other co-occurring predators.

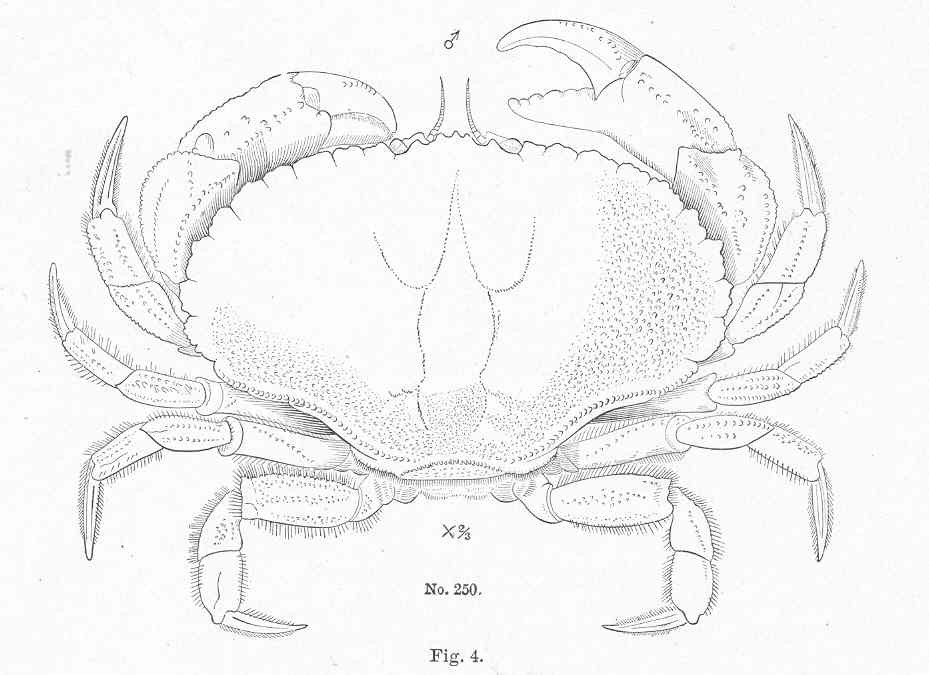

== Diet ==
According to stomach content analysis on individuals from the Gulf of Maine, the diet of Cancer borealis consists of mussels, arthropods, snails, and some algal species. Blue mussels (Mytilus edulis) composed more than 50% of analyzed stomach contents.

== Fishery ==
Jonah crabs have long been caught as bycatch in lobster traps. Once, they were considered a nuisance and a pest that stole the bait in the traps and they were thrown back in the sea by fishermen. In the past twenty years, particularly in New England, landings have increased due to increased fishing pressure and market demand. Landings of Cancer borealis in the United States rose from 2–3 million lb (0.91–1.36 million kg) annually in the 1990s to more than 17 million lb (7.7 million kg) in 2014. In 2014, 70.05% of landings came from Massachusetts, followed by Rhode Island with 24.43%. Jonah crabs are not managed federally in the United States, but instead are managed by individual states with interstate coordination by the Atlantic States Marine Fisheries Commission.

== Cooking ==
Jonah crab has a sweet taste, though it is not as meaty as the West Coast Dungeness crab. The claws can be served steamed and served chilled over ice for an appetizer or the meat used for crab cakes, among many other preparations. Seafood based broths and Asian style soups can be made from the shells and the texture is as fine as snow crab but as firm as Florida stone crab when prepared properly.
