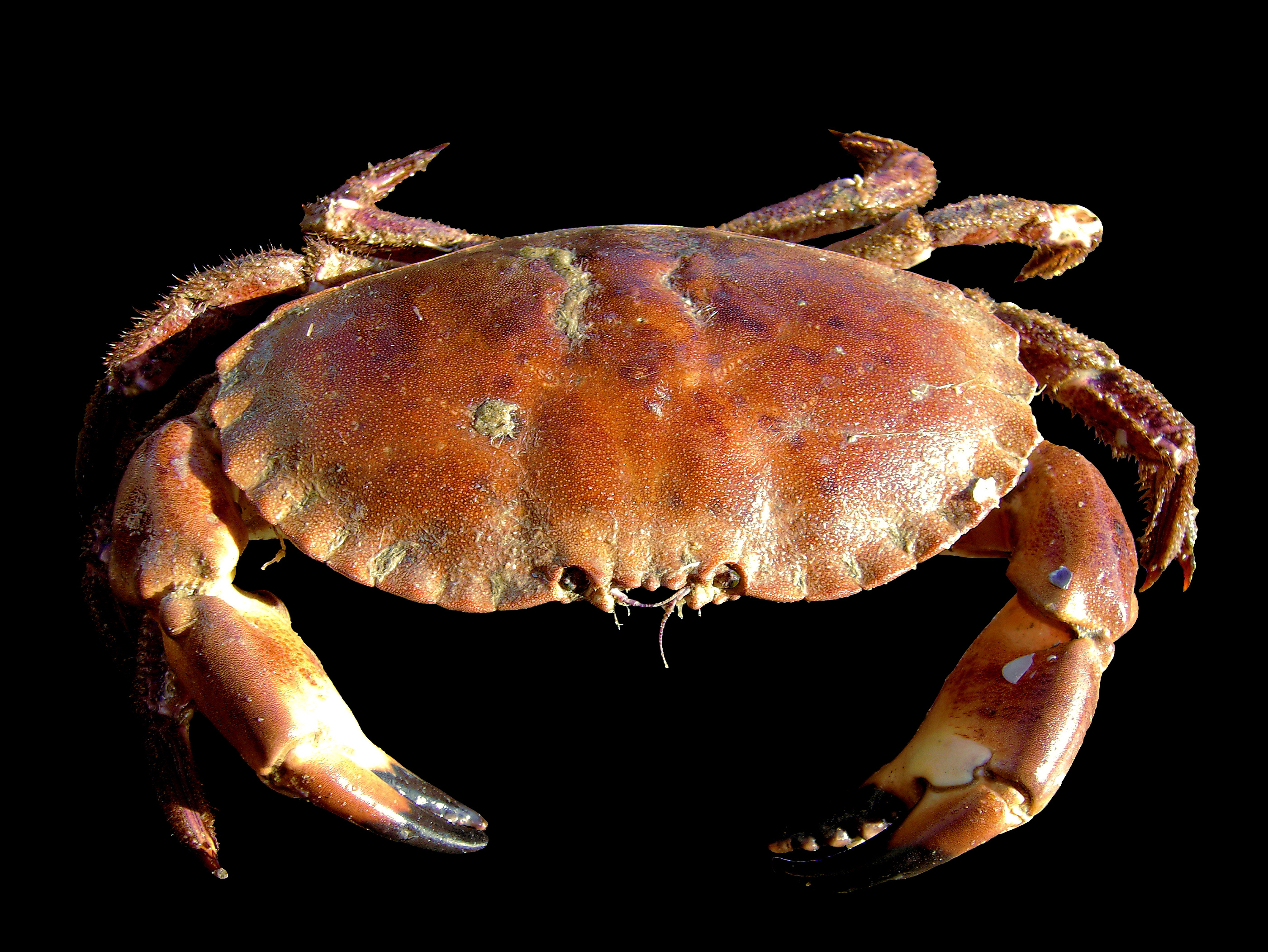
- Cancer pagurus

Scientific classification
- Kingdom: Animalia
- Phylum: Arthropoda
- Clade: Pancrustacea
- Class: Malacostraca
- Order: Decapoda
- Suborder: Pleocyemata
- Infraorder: Brachyura
- Superfamily: Cancroidea
- Family: Cancridae; Latreille, 1802

Subfamilies
- Cancrinae Latreille, 1802; Lobocarcininae Beurlen, 1930

= Cancridae =

Family of crabs

Cancridae is a family of crabs. It comprises six extant genera, and ten exclusively fossil genera, in two subfamilies:

== Extant Genera ==
Cancrinae Latreille, 1802

- Anatolikos Schweitzer & Feldmann, 2000
- Cancer Linnaeus, 1758
- Glebocarcinus Nations, 1975
- Metacarcinus A. Milne-Edwards, 1862
- Platepistoma Rathbun, 1906
- Romaleon Gistel, 1848

=== Fossils ===
Cancrinae Latreille, 1802

- †Anisospinos Schweitzer & Feldmann, 2000
- †Ceronnectes De Angeli & Beschin, 1998
- †Cyclocancer Beurlen, 1958
- †Microdium Reuss, 1867
- †Notocarcinus Schweitzer & Feldmann, 2000
- †Santeecarcinus Blow & Manning, 1996
- †Sarahcarcinus Blow & Manning, 1996

†Lobocarcininae Beurlen, 1930

- †Lobocarcinus Reuss, 1857
- †Miocyclus Müller, 1978
- †Nicoliscarcinus Beschin, Busulini, Tessier & Zorzin, 2016
- †Ramacarcinus De Angeli & Ceccon, 2017
- †Tasadia Müller in Janssen & Müller, 1984

Until 2000, the extant species were all classified in genus Cancer. After an analysis of new fossil material, the subgenera were elevated to the rank of genus, and three new genera were erected. Most of the family's current diversity is found in temperate waters of the Northern Hemisphere.
