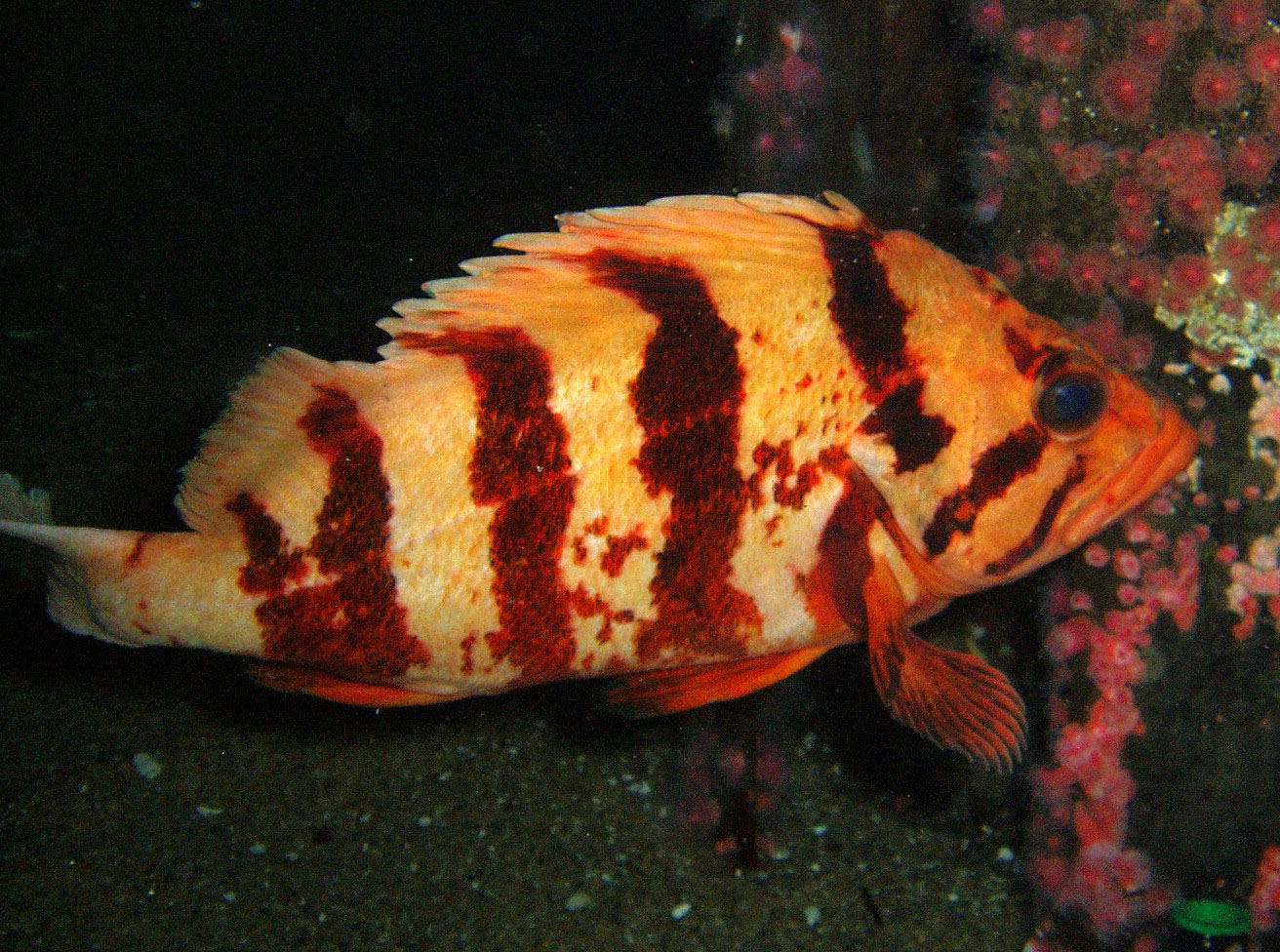
- At the Monterey Bay Aquarium

Conservation status
- Data Deficient (IUCN 3.1)

Scientific classification
- Kingdom: Animalia
- Phylum: Chordata
- Class: Actinopterygii
- Order: Perciformes
- Family: Scorpaenidae
- Genus: Sebastes
- Species: S. nigrocinctus

Binomial name
- Sebastes nigrocinctus Ayres, 1859

Synonyms
- Sebastodes nigrocinctus (Ayres, 1859)

= Tiger rockfish =

Species of fish

The tiger rockfish (Sebastes nigrocinctus), also called tiger seaperch, banded rockfish and black-banded rockfish, is a species of marine ray-finned fish belonging to the subfamily Sebastinae, the rockfishes, part of the family Scorpaenidae. It is native to the waters of the Pacific Ocean off western North America.

== Taxonomy ==
The tiger rockfish was first formally described in 1859 by the American zoologist William Orville Ayres with the type locality given as San Francisco, California. Some authorities place this species in the monotypic subgenus Sebastichthys. The specific name nigrocinctus is a compound of nigra meaning "black" and cinctus meaning "band" or "girdle" a reference to the 5 or 6 black bands on the body of this fish.

== Distribution and habitat ==
The tiger rockfish is found in the eastern Pacific Ocean off the western coast of North America from Cape Resurrection on the Kenai Peninsula in Alaska to Point Buchon on the central coast of California. It is associated with reefs at depths between 10 and 275 m (33 and 902 ft). It can be found on rock reefs and among kelp forests.

== Description ==
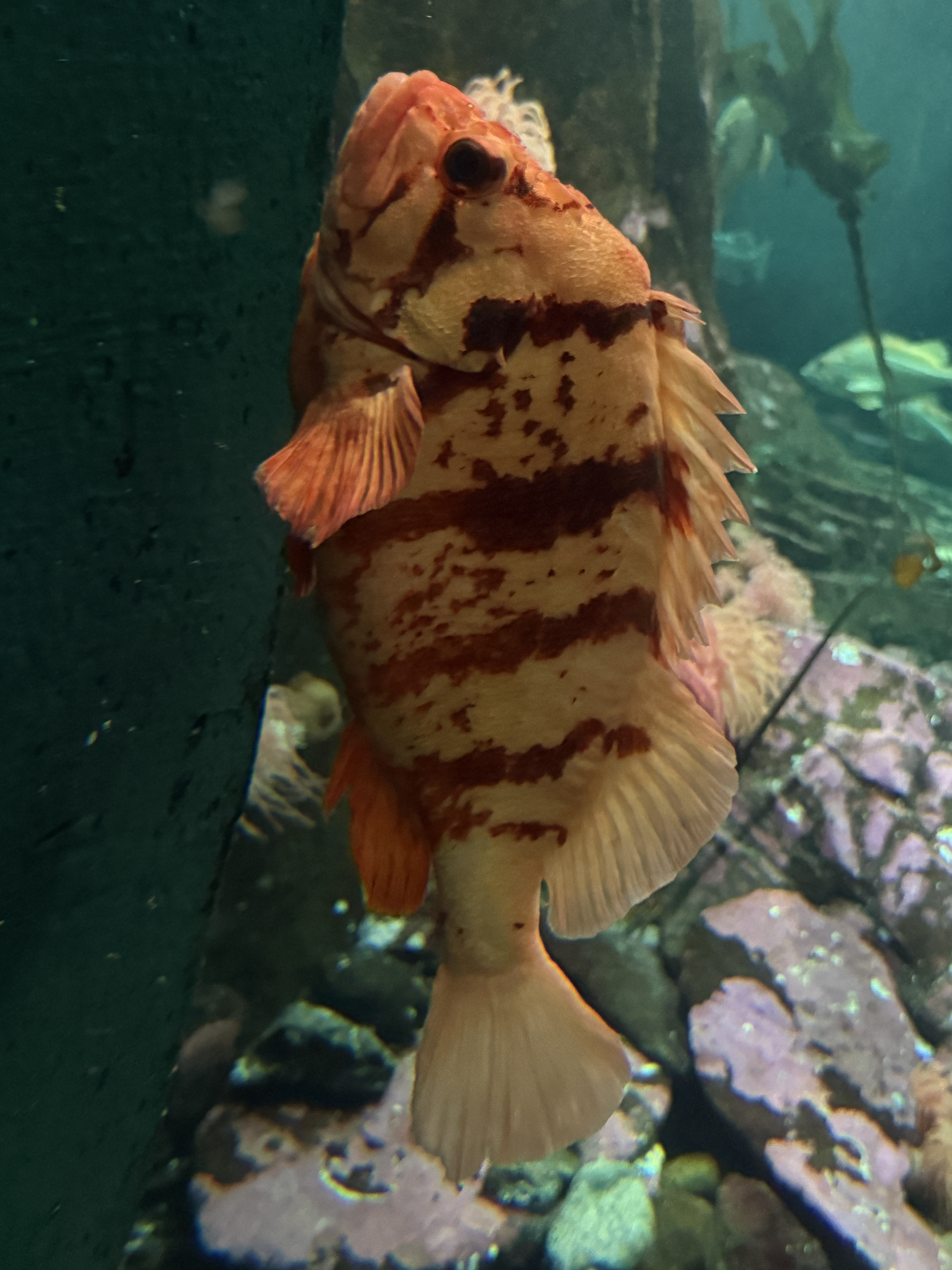
Hovering upright, at the Vancouver Aquarium

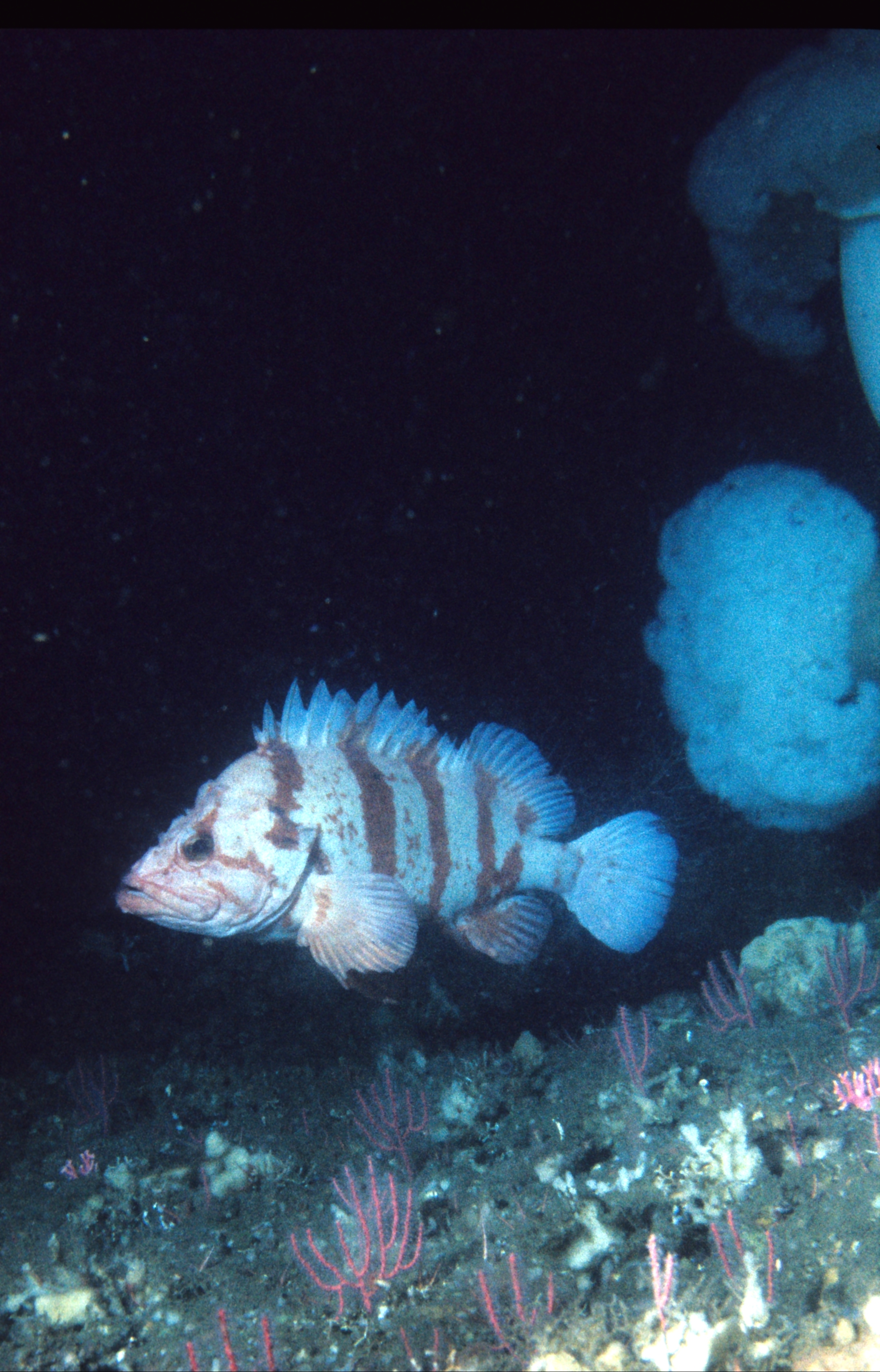
In the wild, in California

The tiger rockfish is a large, heavy bodied species of rockfish with a large mouth. There are 13 robust spines and between 13 and 15 soft rays in the dorsal fin while the anal fin contains 3 spines and 6 or 7 soft rays. There are robust spines on the head and these are the nasal, preocular, supraocular, postocular, tympanic, coronal, parietal and nuchal spines. The space between the eyes is very depressed and the parietal ridges are very wide and rough. The caudal fin is rounded. This species grows to a maximum total length of 61 cm (24 in) with a maximum published weight of 2.2 kg (4.9 lb). Normally they have five vertical bars along the body, these vary in color from red to purple, brown, and black on a pink to white background color. There are also two bars radiating rearwards from the eyes. A few individuals can appear to have had the rearmost pair of bars merged. In younger fishes the tips of the pelvic and anal fins are dark.

== Biology ==
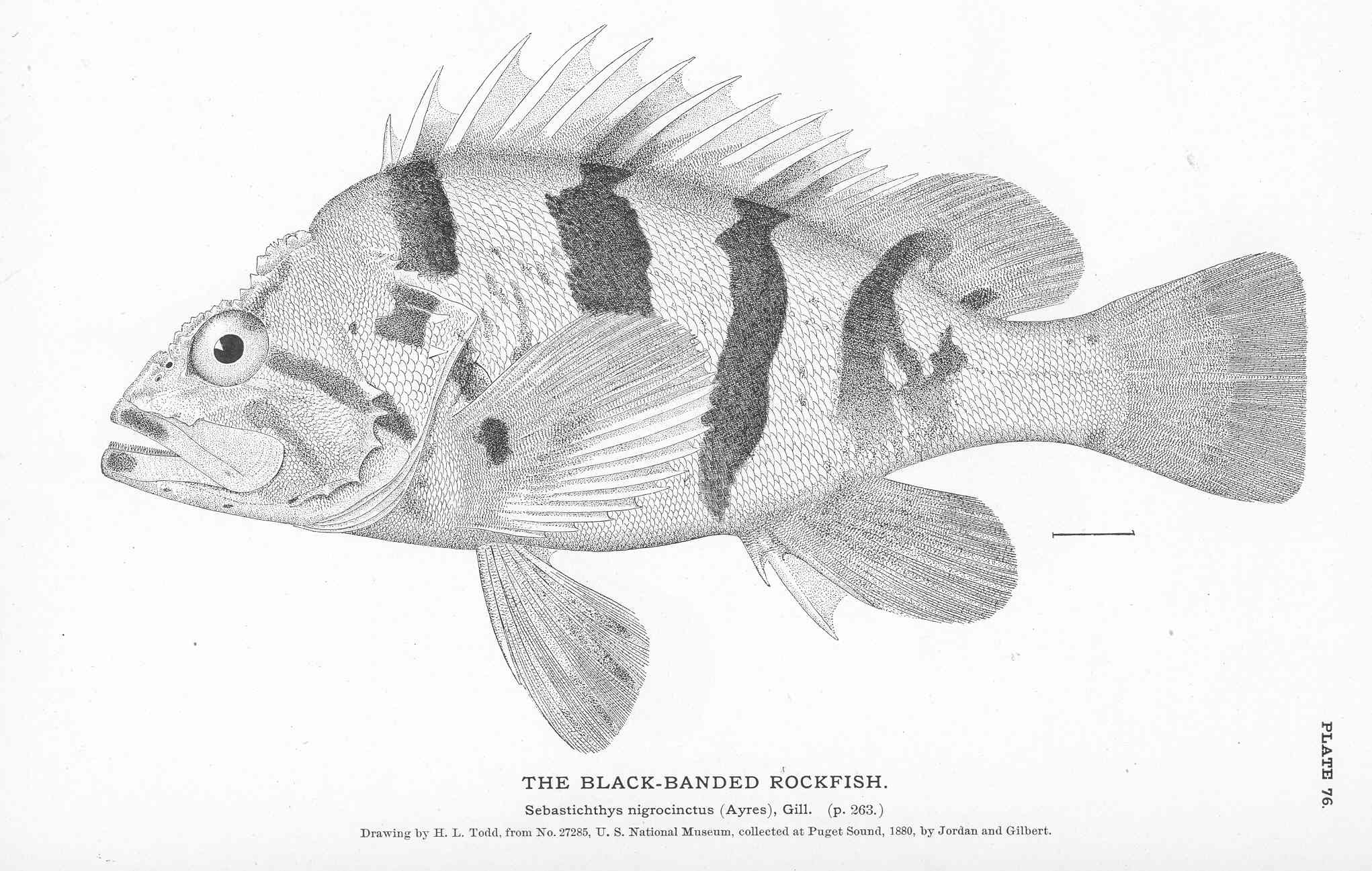
1884 illustration

The tiger rockfish is a solitary and territorial species which defends a shelter, usually a crevice in rocky areas. The juveniles are pelagic. This species can rapidly change color when alarmed or when the light changes. This species is a generalist and is dependent on the currents to bring food to its home range. This food consists of young fishes, especially herring and juvenile rockfish, and crustaceans caridean shrimp, the yellow rock crab (Metacarcinus anthonyi), the brown rock crab (Romaleon antennarium), and the red rock crab (Cancer productus). The maximum reported age for a tiger rockfish is 116 years. Like its congeners, this is an ovoviviparous fish in which the oocytes are fertilized internally and the eggs remain within the females for some time before live larval fish are born. The larval stage lasts for around two months, after which they settle on the bottom as juveniles. Females attain sexual maturity between 27.9 and 45.7 cm (11.0 and 18.0 in) in length and for males it is reached between 35.6 and 48.3 cm (14.0 and 19.0 in) and they may not attain sexual maturity until they are at least eight years old.
