= Metacarcinus starri =

Metacarcinus starri Temporal range: Lower Miocene

Scientific classification
- Kingdom: Animalia
- Phylum: Arthropoda
- Class: Malacostraca
- Order: Decapoda
- Suborder: Pleocyemata
- Infraorder: Brachyura
- Family: Cancridae
- Genus: Metacarcinus
- Species: M. starri

Binomial name
- Metacarcinus starri (Berglund & Goedert, 1996)

Synonyms
- Cancer (Metacarcinus) starri Berglund & Goedert, 1996

Extinct species of crab

Metacarcinus starri is an extinct species of crab in the family Cancridae, subfamily Cancrinae. The species is known solely from the early Miocene, Clallam Formation and the underlying Pysht Formation deposits on the Olympic Peninsula of Washington state, United States.

== History and classification ==
The species is known from only the holotype female, number UWBM 92012, and five other specimens all of which are currently residing in the collections housed at the Burke Museum of Natural History and Culture in Seattle, Washington, USA. The type specimens were first studied by Ross E. Berglund and James L. Goedert. Berglund and Goedert's species description was published in the Journal of Paleontology in 1996. The specific epithet "starri" was coined by the authors in recognition of David Starr, who collected and donated one of the paratype specimens.

When first described, M. starri was named Cancer (Metacarcinus) starri by Berglund and Goedert. In 1975, J. D. Nations had divided the genus Cancer into four subgenera, including Metacarcinus. This placement was followed until 2000, when the subgenera were elevated to full genera by Carrie E. Schweitzer and Rodney M. Feldmann, making the species' binomial Metacarcinus starri.

== Description ==
The oval carapace, nearly straight posterolateral margins, and chelipeds with spiny upper margins are used as the basis for placing the species in Metacarcinus. In comparisons of overall morphology, M. starri was noted to be most similar to the living species M. gracils, commonly called the graceful rock crab. When published, M. starri was the oldest species of Metacarcinus to be described, being older than M. coosensis, which is known from fossils found in Washington, Oregon, and California. It is also the third species of Metacarcinus to be identified from Washington state fossils. The age and location indicate a possible Northern Pacific origin for the genus.

Metacarcinus starri lived and was preserved in strata deposited at depths of 50–70 m (160–230 ft), placing them in the lower sublittoral zone. The specimens were preserved in concretions found as loose float cobbles along the Strait of Juan de Fuca shoreline and collected at sites B6133 and B6136. However the individual cobble matrices match sediments found in the upper Pysht and lower Clallam Formations. This species lived with several other crustaceans, including the crab Pinnixa and a mud shrimp of the genus Callianassa. The extinct species Branchioplax washingtoniana was formerly thought to also occur in the Clallam Formation with M. starri, however with redefinition of the Twin River Group the sediments, B. washingtoniana has been shown to occur in the older Twin River Formation.
