= Dungeness Crab in Puget Sound =

Invertebrate in Puget Sound, WA

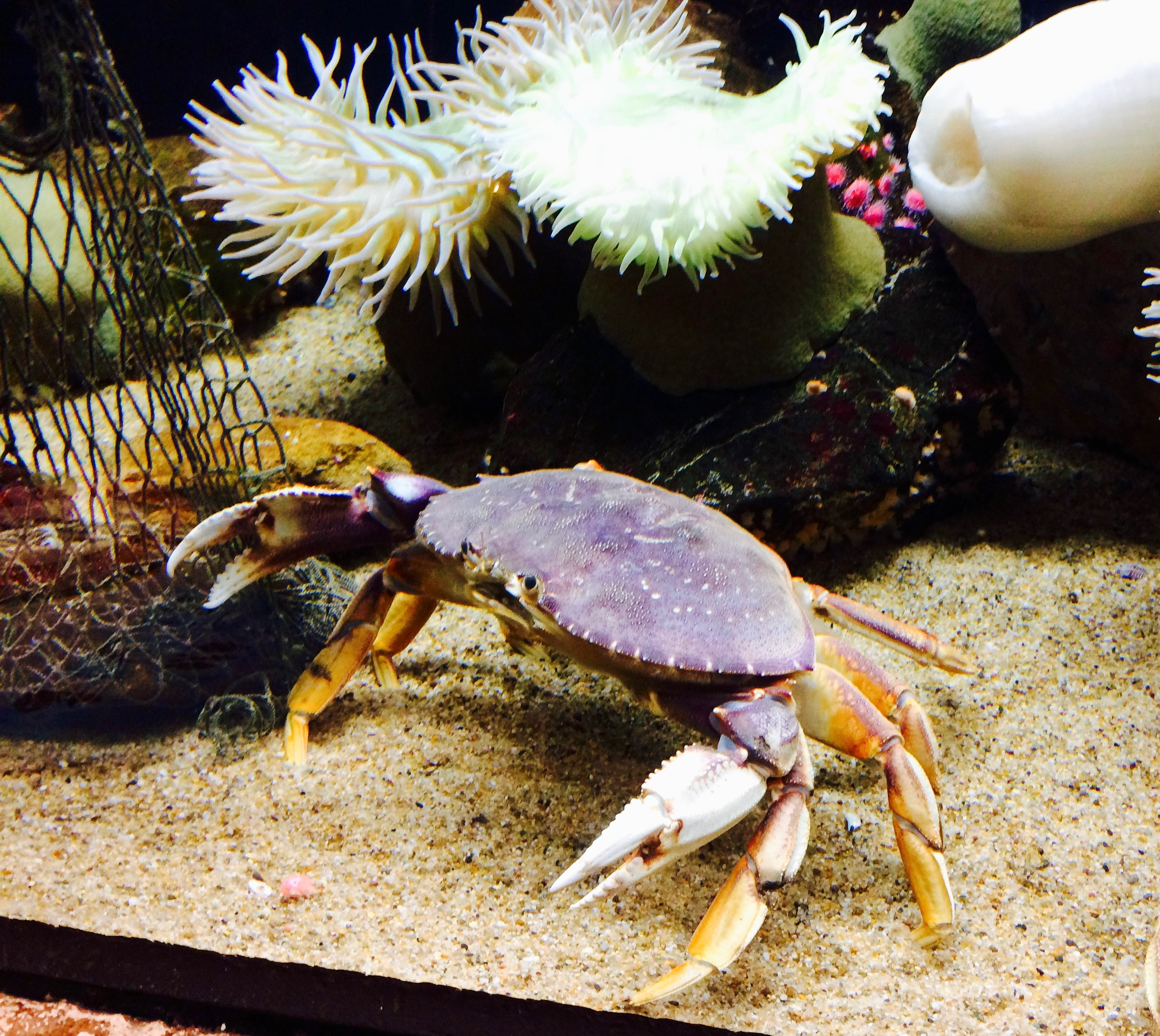
Dungeness Crab in an Aquarium

The Dungeness crab in the Puget Sound, Washington state is a non-genetically distinct population of Dungeness that has been experiencing severely declining populations in the south sound region since 2013. The cause of the decline is unknown, although it has been determined not to be due to overfishing. As crabbing seasons remain closed or severely limited throughout the south sound region, research is focused primarily on larvae in order to predict future population size and study genetics.

== The Puget Sound context ==
Puget Sound Marine Areas

In Washington state, the Puget Sound makes up marine areas 4-13 and is managed separately from the coast. Each marine area within the sound is additionally managed semi-separately and in cooperation with local indigenous tribes. The Puget Sound is generally divided into five areas: the strait of Juan de Fuca, the San Juan islands, the northern sound, the southern sound, and Hood Canal. Marine areas 4, 5, and parts 6 are located in the strait. The rest of area 6 and all of 7 are located in the San Juan islands. The northern sound is made up of areas 8 and 9. The southern sound is made up of areas 10,11, and 13. Hood Canal is marine area 12.

Dungeness are considered the most important fishery in Washington state with a 90-120 million dollar value annually. In Puget Sound there is a yearly summer crabbing season open five days a week from the beginning of July to Labor Day. If populations are determined to be sufficiently abundant, an additional winter season will open in October, for seven days a week (closing on December 31). Out of all the regions, the south sound region has historically had the lowest Dungeness numbers, typically making up only 1-4.3% of the total catch.

== Genetics ==
In 2014, hind legs from 679 Dungeness from five locations in the Puget Sound (Skagit, Hood Canal, Port Townsend, Nisqually, and central sound) were collected. In 2015 hind legs from 1011 Dungeness from nine locations on the coast (three in Kalaloch, Westport, and Long Beach each) were collected. From each sample, 10 neutral microsatellite regions were examined.

Out of all the sites, only Port Townsend and Long Beach were found to have F_{IS} values indicating significant divergence from Hardy-Weinberg proportions. F_{ST} values indicated that Hood Canal was unique among all sites. Hood Canal is connected to the rest of the sound through only one opening in the north which is made shallower by a deep sill. This is most likely the reason for the F_{ST} calculation in this study. The F_{ST} of all other Puget Sound sites indicated differentiation from the coast but not from each other. Using tree topology, all Puget Sound sites, except for Hood Canal, were found to cluster strongly together. The coast sites clustered together weakly and separately from the sound.

The authors of this study conclude that there is stronger connectivity within the Puget Sound and within the coast Dungeness populations than between them, although gene flow does still occur. The authors do point out, however, that it is possible for one population to seem genetically similar to another using neutral markers, even when no recent gene flow has occurred.

== Population decrease and response ==
In 2013, Dungeness crab harvest in the southern most marine area, area 13, began to decline at an unusually high rate. By 2015, this decline had begun to be noticed throughout the southern Puget Sound region and into Hood Canal. By 2018, harvesting in marine area 13 had declined 97% since 2012 and in marine area 11 had declined 87% since 2015. At this point marine areas 11, 12, and 13 were closed for recreational crabbing with tribes in the areas additionally restricting harvesting to subsistence and ceremonial purposes only. Although red rock crabs do not seem to be affected by whatever is causing the Dungeness decrease, the red rock crabbing season was additionally closed to reduce handling of Dungeness.

Since 2015, the Washington Department of Fish and Wildlife (WDFW) has conducted yearly test fishing throughout the sound. This test fishing occurs in February and is conducted with pots that do not have escape rings, in order to catch females and smaller males. In 2018, an average of 0.3 legal crabs per trap were found in the south sound. Although it is not stated what healthy numbers would be, considering this region has historically lower catch than other parts of the sound, the healthy population in marine area 8 had 17-34 legal crabs per trap in 2018. One important note from the 2018 test fishing is that no crabs in the size range of 3.5 to 5.7 inches were found in the south sound. This indicates several years of crabs were missing from the area. In 2022, there was a slight increase in crab populations with 0.97 legal crabs being found per pot. In 2023, the average was 1.98 male crabs (legal and illegal size) per pot.

The most recent update on marine area closures is the following:

- Areas 4, 5, 6, 7, 8, 9, and north 12 were open for typical days in both summer and winter 2023
- Area 10 was open in the summer two days a week from July 2 to Sept 4. It was closed for the winter 2023
- Area 11 was open in the summer two days a week from July 2 to August 28. It was closed in the winter 2023
- Areas 13 and south 12 were closed for both summer and winter 2023

== Research ==
In 2019, the Pacific Northwest Crab Research Group (PCRG) was founded. This group began with the goal of predicting adult crab abundance in the Puget Sound. This is done through counting of larval Dungeness and application of those numbers to an equation from a study conducted by the University of Oregon that predicts adult crab abundance four years into the future. In the summer of 2022, the research was expanded to the coast of Washington and the section of the Salish Sea located in Canada. That summer genetic research on the larvae also began. This research is funded through the summer of 2024.

The PCRG collects larvae through a light trap made out of a water jug and LED lights. The lights turn on and off at dawn and dusk and attract the diel vertical migrator larvae. Based on knowledge of typical larval delivery, traps are set at the beginning of April. Traps are checked throughout the summer and are removed from the water after two full weeks of no Dungeness larvae catch, which usually occurs in September. The PCRG originally had ten locations (five in the San Juan region, one in the north sound, two in the south sound, and two in Hood Canal). In the 2023 summer season 20 locations were tested in Washington (three on the coast, six in the San Juan region, three in the north sound, six in the south sound, and two in Hood Canal) with an additional 25 in Canada. Running the sites were 13 tribes, 12 non-profits, 4 aquariums, 3 universities, 3 community centers, 2 museums, 2 boating clubs, 1 high school, the Washington Department of Fish and Wildlife, the Washington Department of Natural Resources, and Fisheries and Oceans Canada.

Results of the population research are verbally reported every winter at the annual meeting of the PCRG and are briefly summarized in the Puget Sound Marine Waters' yearly publications. Additionally, the Swinomish tribe reports annually on the five sites they manage in the San Juan islands. Every year since 2019, larval size has decreased at all sites as the season progresses. It is theorized that the size differences indicate different origin populations for the larvae. The large larvae (seen in April, May, and June) are thought to be from the coast and the smaller larvae (seen in June, July, and August) are thought to be from local populations. The first larvae of the season have been found in the San Juan islands every year. As the season continues, larvae are progressively found to the north and south. Southern Hood Canal is thought to have a unique population of Dungeness as the first larvae at the site are consistently found around the same time as the San Juans despite being in a very isolated inlet. From 2019 to 2021, the highest yearly count of Dungeness occurred in June. In 2022 and 2023, the highest yearly count occurred in July; these two years also saw a later start to the delivery season than in the past. It is thought that cooler temperatures impacted this change in larval delivery patterns. The central Salish Sea (from Whidbey Island to Horseshoe Bay) has consistently had the highest total catch of larvae with catch decreasing to the north and south. Catch is consistently the lowest at the site located in Washington marine area 13.

The genetic portion of the PCRG research is ongoing and no progress reports have been published.

== Potential reasons for decline ==
Overharvesting has been determined not to be the reason for the decline in Dungeness crab. Harvesting in marine areas 12 and 13 have now been closed for six years; if overharvesting was the issue, populations would have recovered by now given that females are not harvested and males have at least a year of sexual maturity before they are of legal harvesting size.

One hypothesis for the decline is warmer bottom conditions in the south sound due to shallower waters. It is hypothesized that this may harm juvenile crabs more than adults. Warmer surface temperatures may have a greater effect than warmer bottom waters, however. This is because the free-swimming larvae have a narrower temperature range than adults. Another hypothesis for decline is an increase in hypoxic conditions. This hypothesis is particularly viable for the population in Hood Canal where hypoxic conditions have occurred in the past. Ocean acidification is a third hypothesis for decline. Ocean acidification has been shown in laboratory conditions to delay development, increase mortality, and decrease exoskeleton size of larval Dungeness. Testing in the wild has not yet occurred. The results of current and future research will deliver valuable information regarding these hypotheses.
