= Yellow crab =

The common name yellow crab may refer to any of the following species:

- Eriphia verrucosa (Eriphiidae)
- Hemigrapsus oregonensis (Varunidae)
- Metacarcinus anthonyi (formerly Cancer anthonyi; Cancridae)

== See also ==
- Yellow crab spider, Misumena vatia
