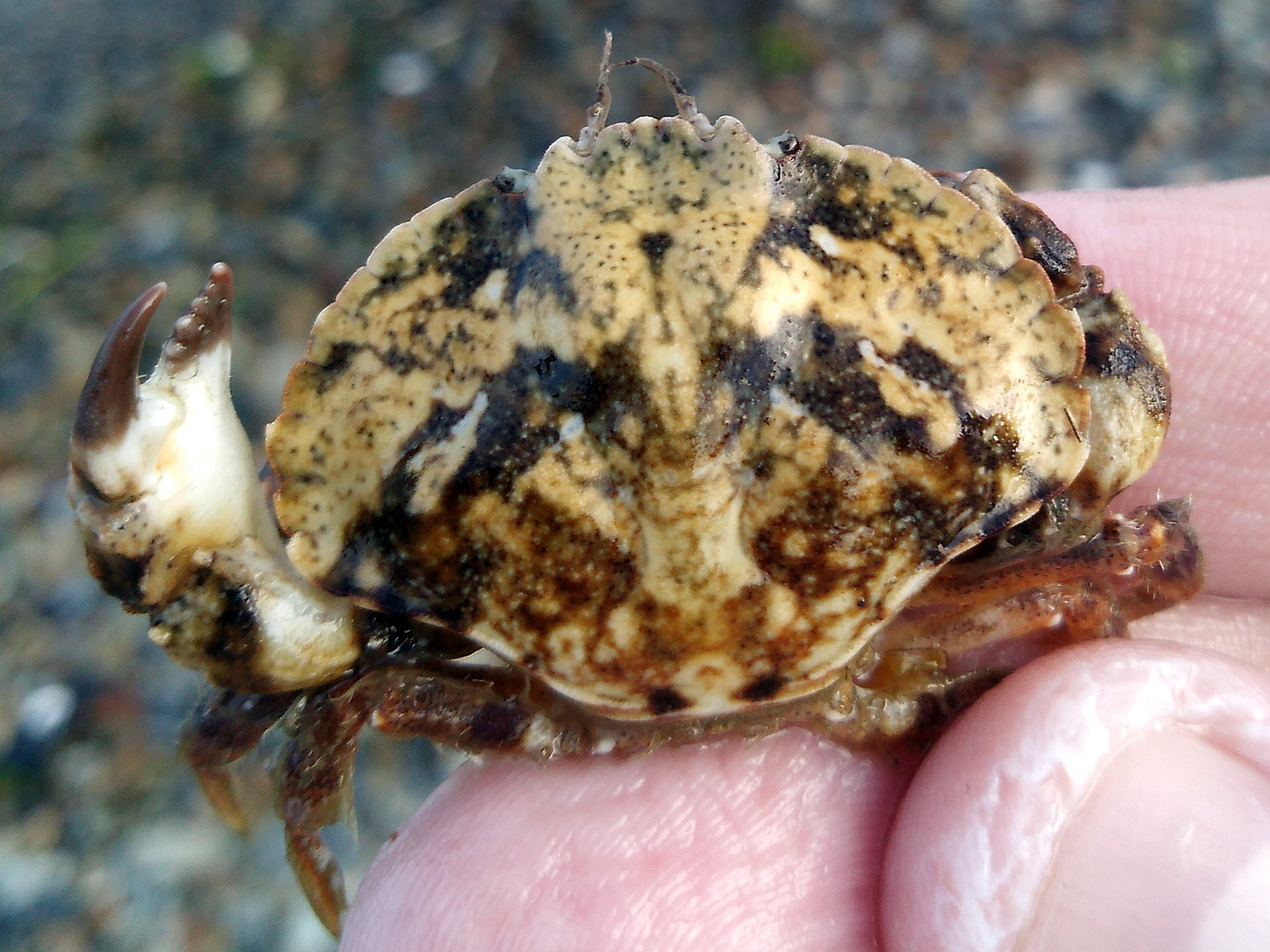
- Glebocarcinus amphioetus

Scientific classification
- Kingdom: Animalia
- Phylum: Arthropoda
- Class: Malacostraca
- Order: Decapoda
- Suborder: Pleocyemata
- Infraorder: Brachyura
- Family: Cancridae
- Genus: Glebocarcinus; Nations, 1975

Type species
- Trichocera oregonensis Dana, 1852

= Glebocarcinus =

Genus of crabs

Glebocarcinus is a genus of crabs formerly included in the genus Cancer.

== Species ==
The genus contains two species:

Image	Scientific name	Distribution
	Glebocarcinus oregonensis (Dana, 1852)	Pacific coast of North America.
	Glebocarcinus amphioetus (Rathbun, 1898)	Pacific coast of North America
