= Metacarcinus minutoserratus =

Metacarcinus minutoserratus Temporal range: Pliocene

Scientific classification
- Domain: Eukaryota
- Kingdom: Animalia
- Phylum: Arthropoda
- Class: Malacostraca
- Order: Decapoda
- Suborder: Pleocyemata
- Infraorder: Brachyura
- Family: Cancridae
- Genus: Metacarcinus
- Species: †M. minutoserratus

Binomial name
- †Metacarcinus minutoserratus (Nagao, 1940)

Extinct species of crab

Metacarcinus minutoserratus is an extinct crab from the family Cancridae, which is known for its robust, often rounded carapaces.

== Description ==
This species was described based on fossil evidence and is thought to have lived during the Pliocene epoch. It was first discovered by Japanese biologist Hideki Nagamori in 1940 "from a cliff outcrop of the right bank of the Himekawa River near Miyamoto, Otari Village, Kita-azumi County, Nagano Prefecture, central Japan."
