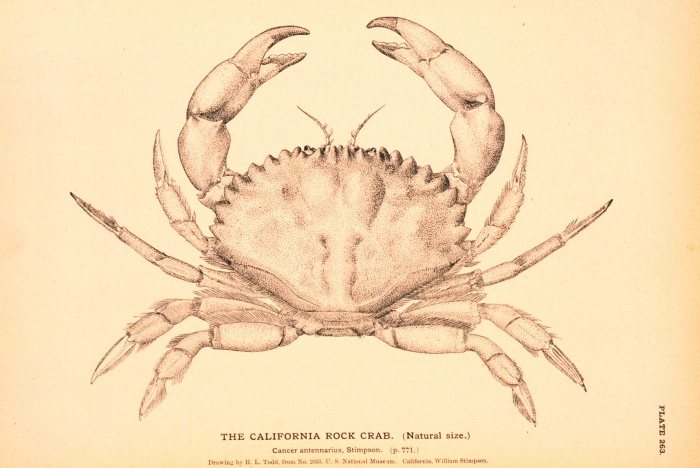
- California rock crab, Romaleon antennarium
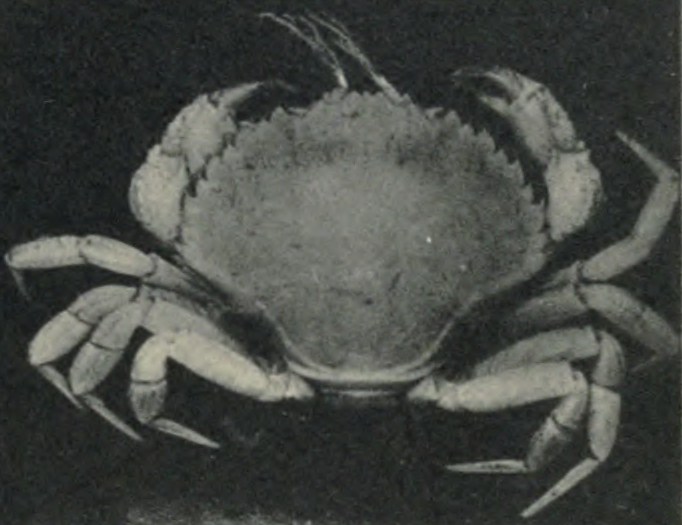
- Romaleon jordani female

Scientific classification
- Kingdom: Animalia
- Phylum: Arthropoda
- Class: Malacostraca
- Order: Decapoda
- Suborder: Pleocyemata
- Infraorder: Brachyura
- Family: Cancridae
- Subfamily: Cancrinae
- Genus: Romaleon; Gistl, 1848

Type species
- Romaleon gibbosulus Rathbun, 1898

= Romaleon =

Genus of crabs

Romaleon is a genus of marine crabs formerly considered in the genus Cancer.

== Species ==
The genus, as currently circumscribed, contains seven species:

Image	Scientific name	Distribution
	Romaleon antennarium Stimpson, 1856 Pacific, brown or California rock crab	North America.
	Romaleon branneri Rathbun, 1926 Furrowed rock crab	Granite Cove, Port Althorp, Alaska, to Santa Catalina Islands, California
	Romaleon gibbosulum De Haan, 1833	Japan to North China and Korea
	Romaleon jordani Rathbun, 1900 Hairy Rock Crab	Pacific coast
	Romaleon luzonense Sakai 1983	Philippines, Sunda Strait
	Romaleon nadaense Sakai, 1969	South China Sea
	Romaleon polyodon Poeppig, 1836	Chile and Peru
