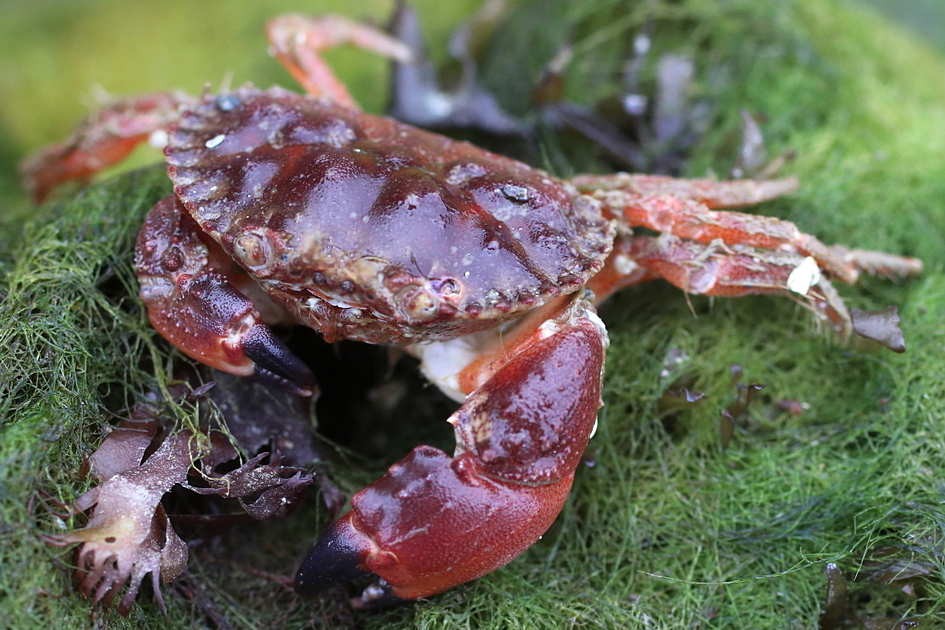

Scientific classification
- Kingdom: Animalia
- Phylum: Arthropoda
- Class: Malacostraca
- Order: Decapoda
- Suborder: Pleocyemata
- Infraorder: Brachyura
- Family: Cancridae
- Genus: Glebocarcinus
- Species: G. oregonensis

Binomial name
- Glebocarcinus oregonensis (Dana, 1852)

Synonyms
- Trichocera oregonensis Dana, 1852; Platycarcinus recurvidens Bate, 1864; Trichocarcinus walkeri Holmes, 1900; Lophopanopeus somaterianus Rathbun, 1930

= Glebocarcinus oregonensis =

Species of crab

Glebocarcinus oregonensis, commonly known as the pygmy rock crab, is a species of crab found on the Pacific coast of North America.

== Description ==
It is usually red/brown but this may vary; their legs have many setae (hairs). The carapace reaches a width of about 5 centimetres (2 in), and is widest at the 7th or 8th lateral tooth. The chelipeds are black at the tip, and the dactylus of the cheliped has no spiny ridges; the dorsal surface is covered with small tubercles (rounded projections), and males have larger chelipeds than females.

== Ecology ==
Glebocarcinus oregonensis is found mostly in crevices, holes (dead barnacles) and under rocks. They can live in depths of up to 1,400 feet (430 m). They are nocturnal feeders, feeding mostly on small barnacles, snails, bivalves, worms, green algae and Pacific oysters. Predators include Pacific cod, river otters and red rock crab.

Breeding occurs during the summer, and the Puget Sound females carry eggs from November to May. It is not unusual to find harems consisting of one male with as many as seven females. Males may carry females that are molting and continue until their new shell hardens, for mating occurs after females molt.
