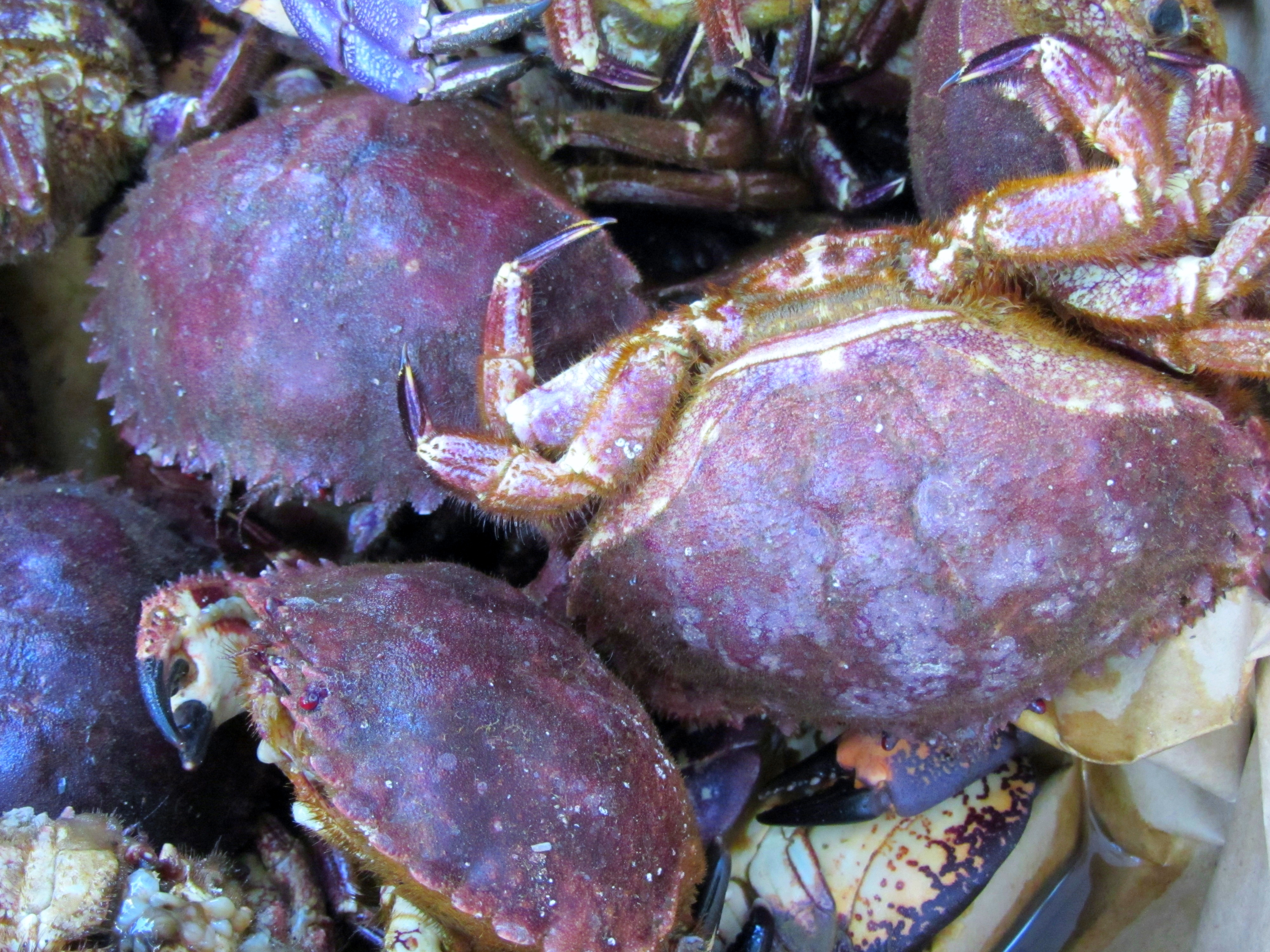

Scientific classification
- Kingdom: Animalia
- Phylum: Arthropoda
- Class: Malacostraca
- Order: Decapoda
- Suborder: Pleocyemata
- Infraorder: Brachyura
- Family: Cancridae
- Genus: Metacarcinus
- Species: M. edwardsii

Binomial name
- Metacarcinus edwardsii (Bell, 1835)

Synonyms
- Cancer edwardsii Bell, 1835; Cancer edwardsii var. annulipes Miers, 1881

= Metacarcinus edwardsii =

Species of crab

Metacarcinus edwardsii, sometimes known as mola rock crab, southern rock crab, or Chilean rock crab, is a species of crab from the Pacific coast of South America.

== Distribution ==
Metacarcinus edwardsii is found along the Pacific coast between Guayaquil in Ecuador and the Beagle Channel in the southernmost Chile.

== Description ==
Females reach functional maturity at carapace width 106 mm (4.2 in), that is, 50% of females are egg-bearing at this size. Males reach functional maturity at slightly larger sizes. The largest male crabs measure about 165 mm (6.5 in) in carapace width.

Metacarcinus edwardsii is univoltine, with the mating season from October to January.

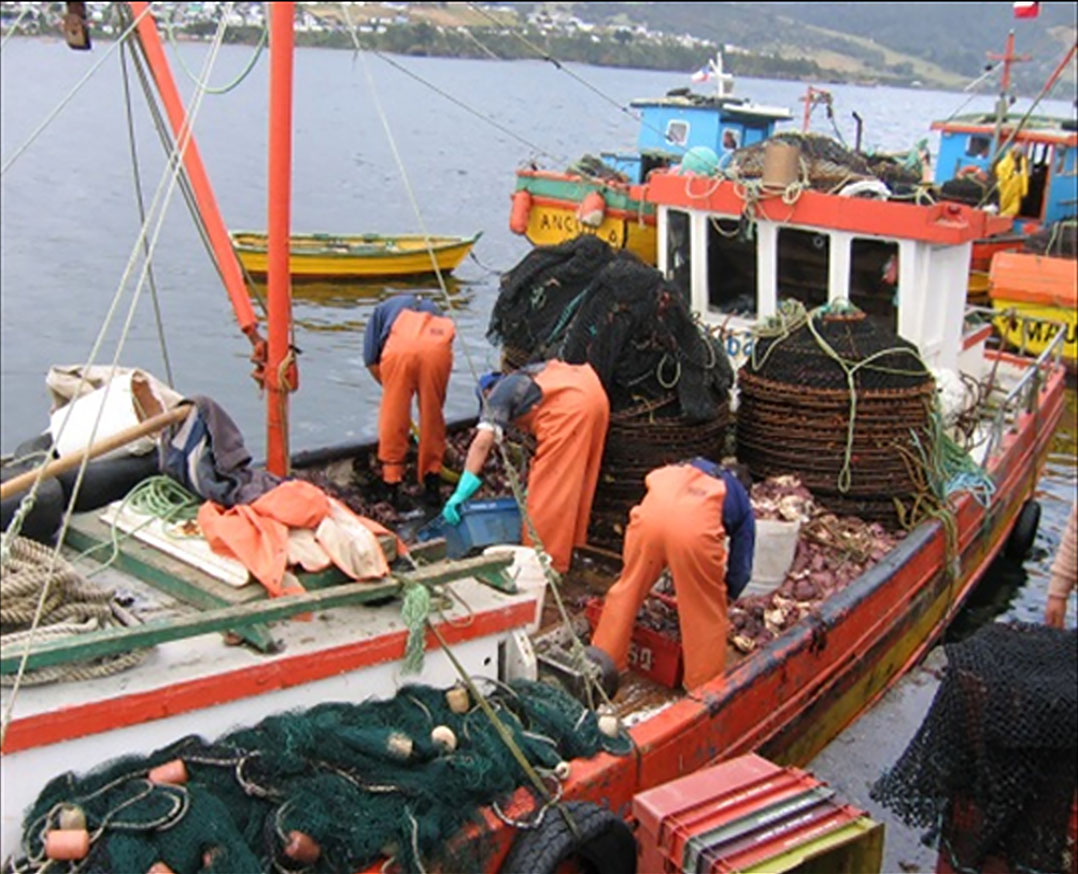
A typical boat involved in the crab fishery in southern Chile

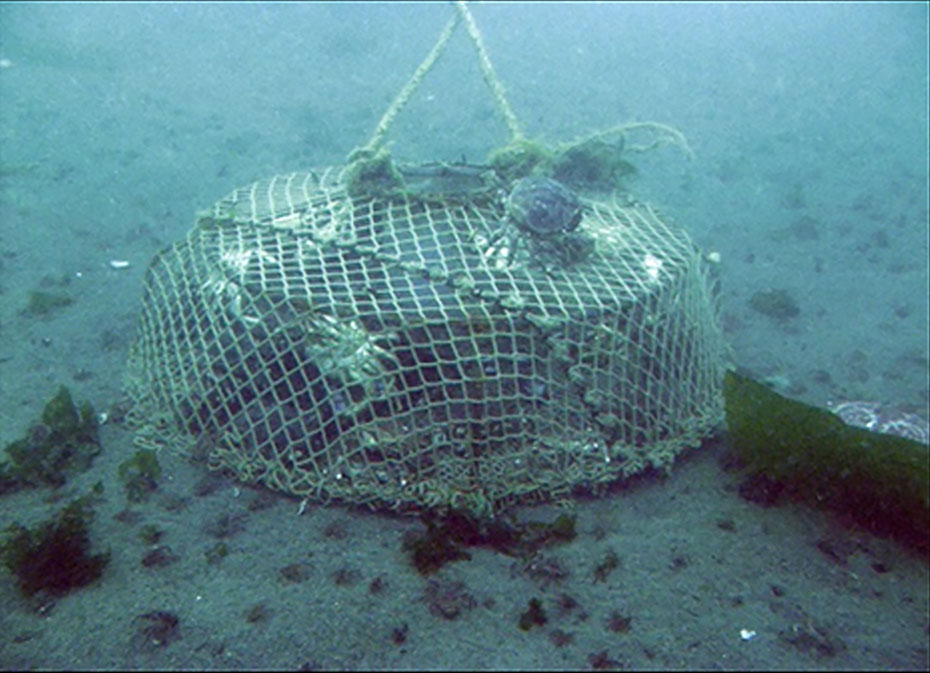
Typical crab trap used to catch Metacarcinus edwardsii in southern Chile

== Utilization ==
In Chile, it is the most important commercially exploited crab, caught exclusively in artisanal fisheries.
