= Red rock crab =

Red rock crab may refer to several species of crab:

- Cancer productus, common along the western coast of North America
- Grapsus grapsus, common along the western coast of South America
- Guinusia chabrus (formerly Plagusia chabrus), found in the southern Indian and Pacific Oceans from South Africa to Chile
