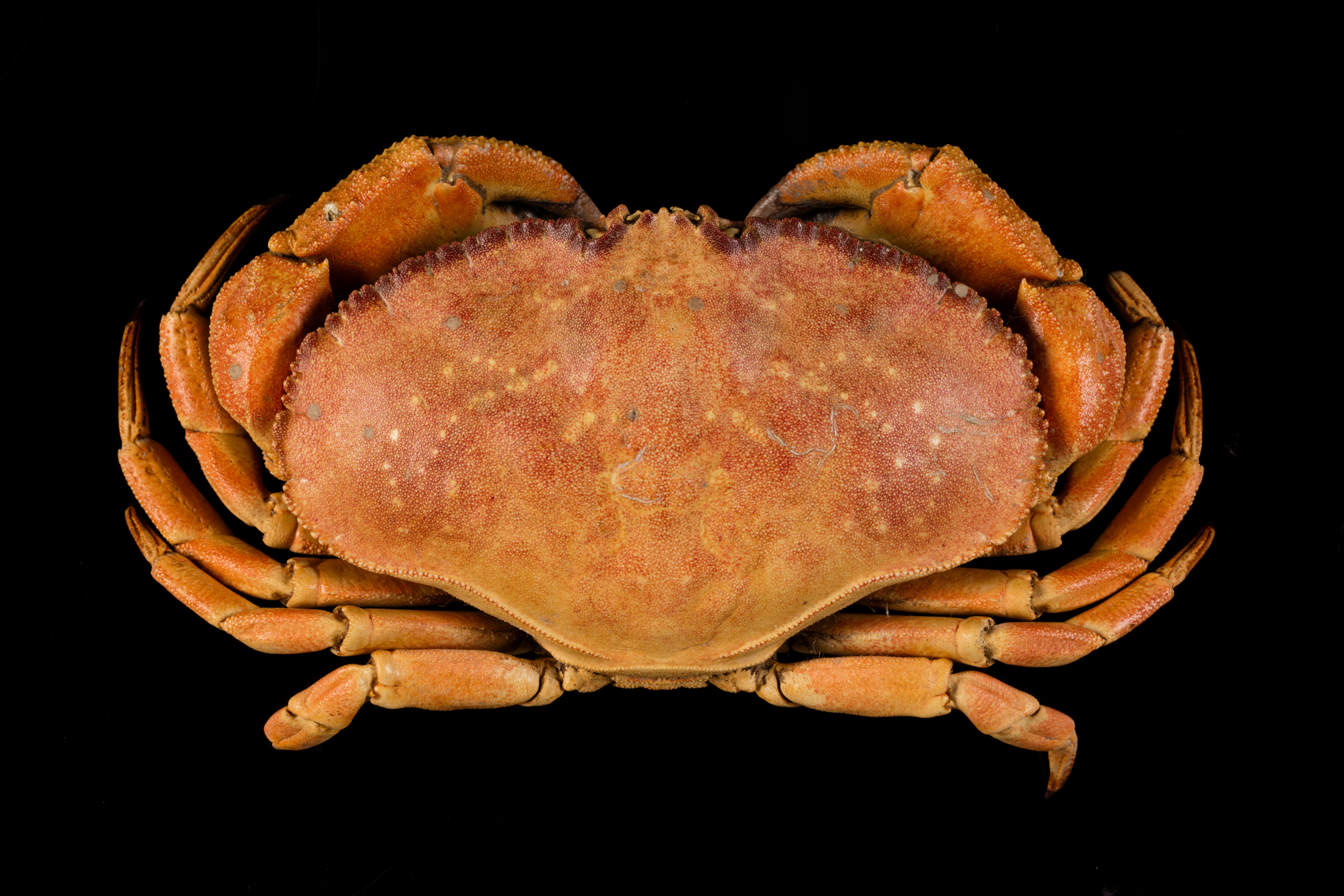
- Dorsal view

Scientific classification
- Kingdom: Animalia
- Phylum: Arthropoda
- Clade: Pancrustacea
- Class: Malacostraca
- Order: Decapoda
- Suborder: Pleocyemata
- Infraorder: Brachyura
- Family: Cancridae
- Genus: Metacarcinus
- Species: M. novaezelandiae

Binomial name
- Metacarcinus novaezelandiae (Hombron & Jacquinot, 1846)

Synonyms
- Platycarcinus novaezelandiae Hombron & Jacquinot, 1846; Cancer novaezelandiae (Jacquinot, 1853)

= Pie crust crab =

Pie crust crab Temporal range: Miocene–Recent

Species of crab

The pie crust crab (Metacarcinus novaezelandiae, formerly Cancer novaezelandiae), is a species of crab found around New Zealand and south-eastern Australia.

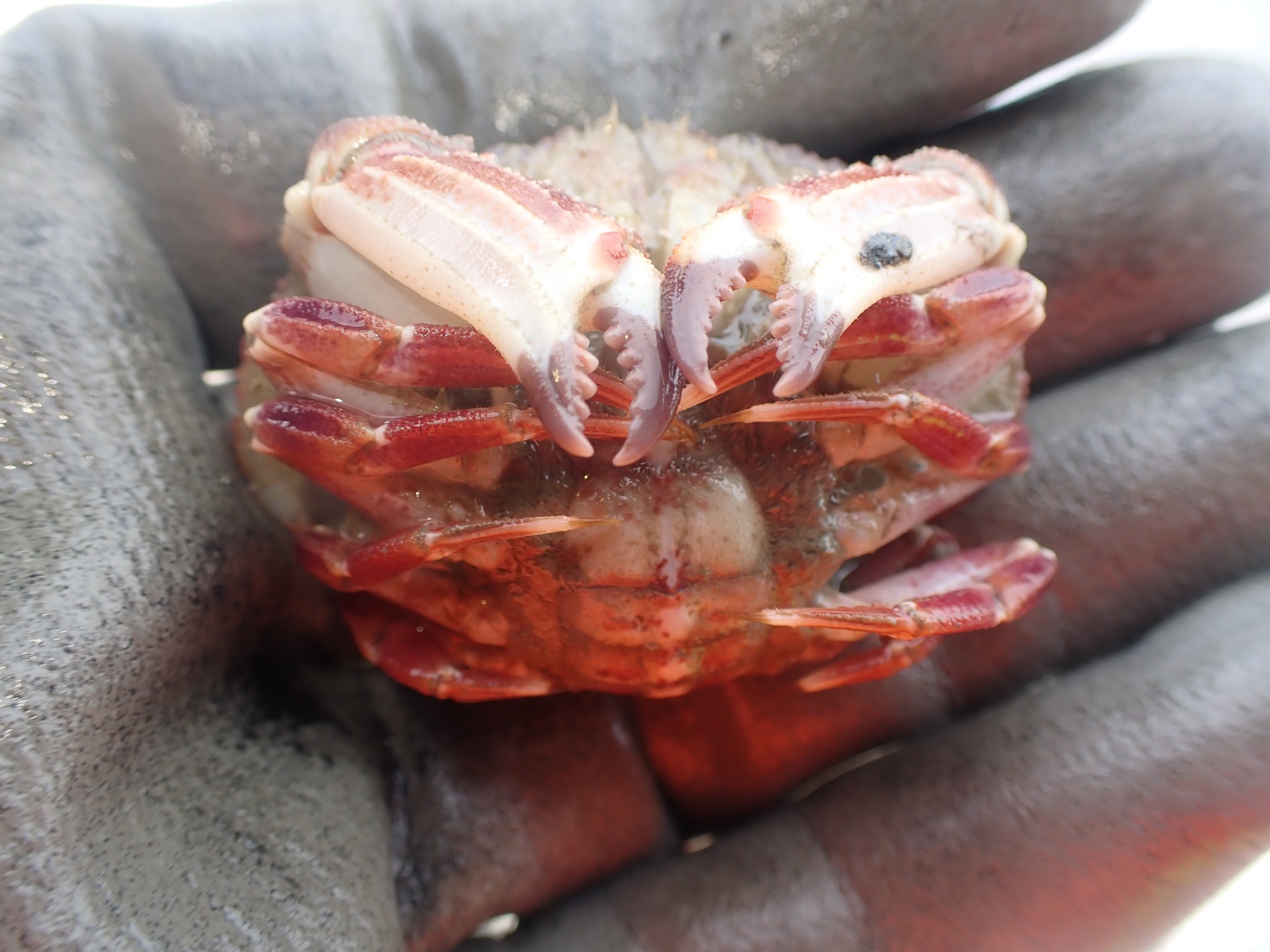
Underside of M. novaezelandiae

== Diet and foraging ==
In larval form Metacarcinus novaezelandieae consumes mostly tiny plankton. Once fully grown though they are primarily carnivorous, hunting nocturnally and preying on a variety of organisms. Molluscs (bivalves, gastropods and cephalopods) make up approximately one third of its diet and are its main food source; followed by crustaceans (amphipods, isopods, crabs and shrimp) which make up about 20% of its diet. Other food sources include small fish, sea anemones, sea sponges and algae. M. novaezelandieae hunts by using its powerful chelae to catch, kill, crush and access its prey, then feeds using its mouthparts. Its claws are capable of breaking open the tough shells of molluscs allowing the crab to reach the soft mollusc body inside and feed on it. Its claws allow it to effectively kill other forms of prey such as crustaceans as well.

== Predators, parasites and diseases ==
In larval form, Metacarcinus novaezelandieae is preyed upon by various fish species. As an adult, it has several main predators. Sea and shore birds (such as gulls) prey on crabs that expose themselves, often flying them up high and then dropping them to crack the tough crab exoskeleton. Larger fish with strong teeth prey upon these crabs under the water. Humans kill and eat these crabs when gathering food from the coast; as well as indirectly killing them from various industrial, scientific and commercial operations.

== Cultural uses ==
New Zealand Maori have historically eaten crabs as part of their kai moana (food from the ocean) diet. Crabs were an easy resource to gather as they are often found in coastal shallows, making them easily accessible sea food. M. novaezelandieae is most likely among the many species of crabs the Maori ate, as it grows to a size large enough to be considered for eating, as well as being found throughout New Zealand. Sea food including M. novaezelandieae are still claimed by Maori today as a cultural food resource.

== Fossil record ==
Fossils of the species are known from the Miocene of New Zealand.
