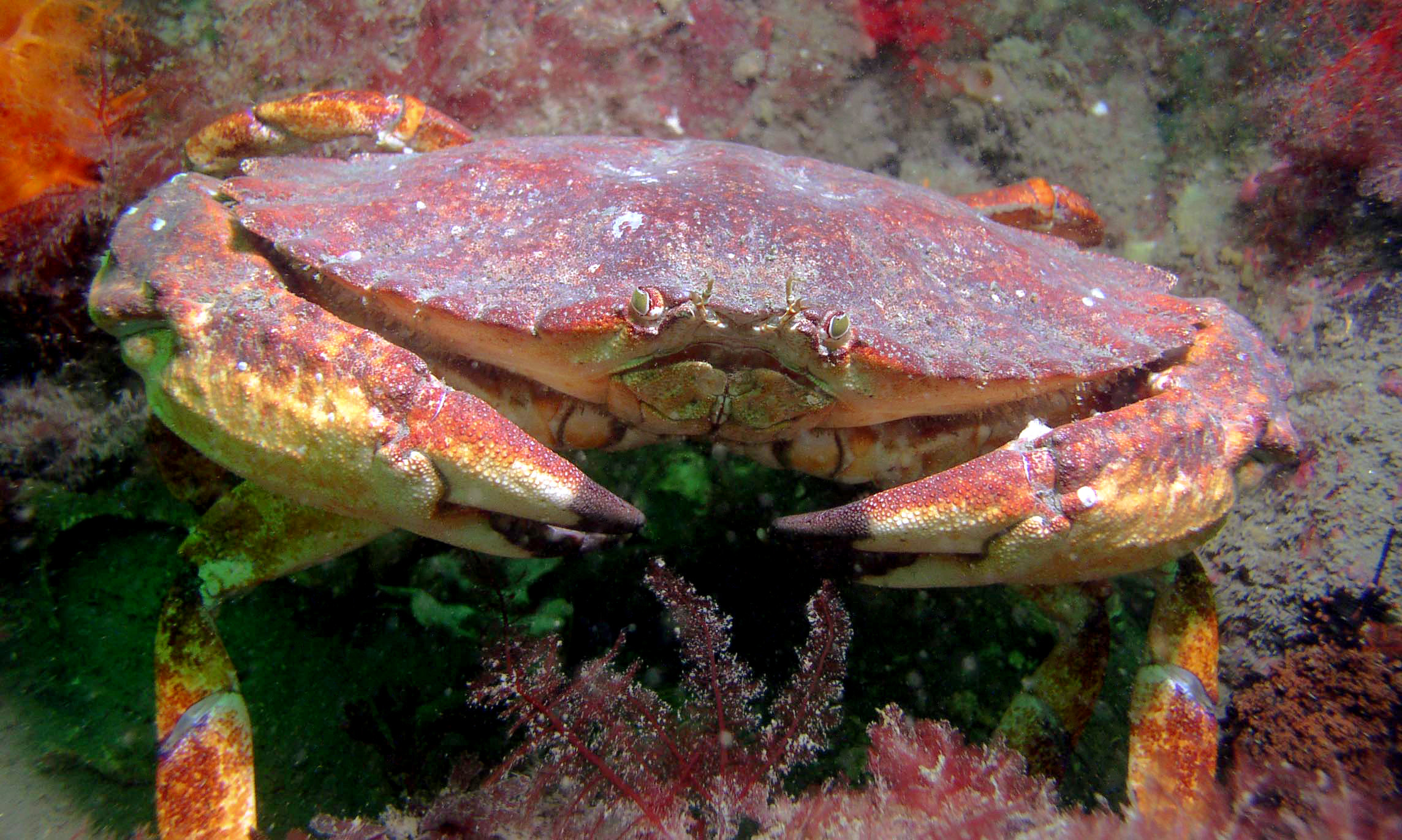

Conservation status
- Least Concern (IUCN 3.1)

- Secure (NatureServe)

Scientific classification
- Kingdom: Animalia
- Phylum: Arthropoda
- Clade: Pancrustacea
- Class: Malacostraca
- Order: Decapoda
- Suborder: Pleocyemata
- Infraorder: Brachyura
- Family: Cancridae
- Genus: Cancer
- Species: C. productus

Binomial name
- Cancer productus Randall, 1839

= Cancer productus =

Species of crab

Cancer productus, one of several species known as red rock crabs, is a crab of the genus Cancer found on the western coast of North America. This species is commonly nicknamed the Pearl of the Pacific Northwest.

== Description ==
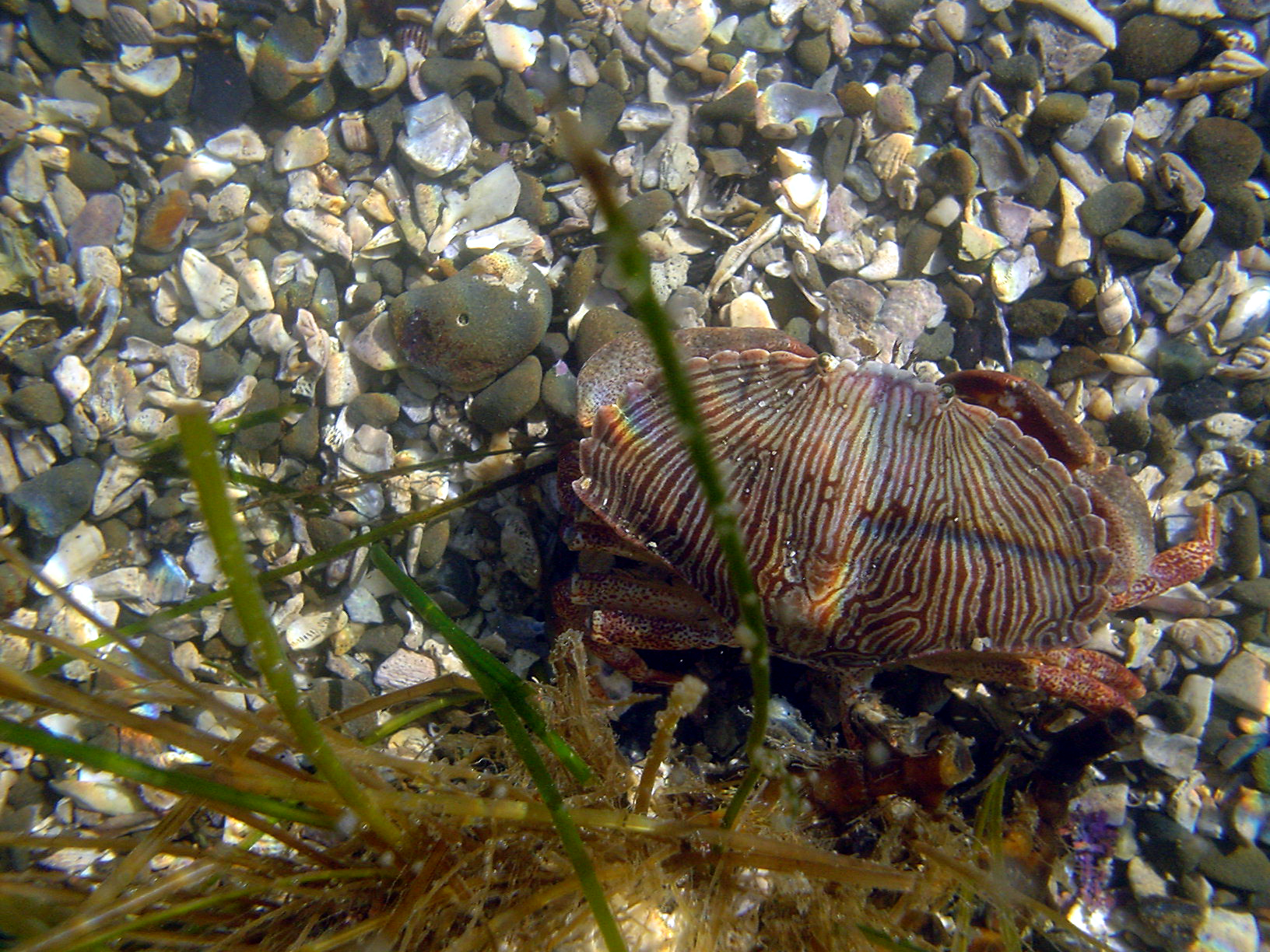
Juveniles may be variously patterned

Cancer productus has carapace teeth that are somewhat broad and rounded with teeth between the eyes of nearly equal size and shape. The carapace of C. productus is widest at the posterior-most tooth, up to 20.0 cm wide. The pincers are large with distinctive black tips. This species lacks serrations or projections on the ventral side of the claws. Adults have a brick-red coloration throughout. The coloration of juveniles is diverse, often white, sometimes with red spots, or zebra-striped.

== Similar species ==
Dungeness crab (Metacarcinus magister) has serrations on the dorsal side of the chelipeds and lacks black tips. The graceful rock crab (Metacarcinus gracilis) has a single projection on the dorsal side of the chelipeds and also lacks black tips, and the widest point of carapace is at the second posterior-most tooth. The pygmy rock crab (Glebocarcinus oregonensis) has black-tipped chelipeds, but has large tubercles on the dorsum. Glebocarcinus oregonensis is also much smaller, such that a C. productus of similar size would generally have a striking juvenile coloration. Cancer pagurus is very similar, but distinguished by its non-overlapping range.

== Range and habitat ==
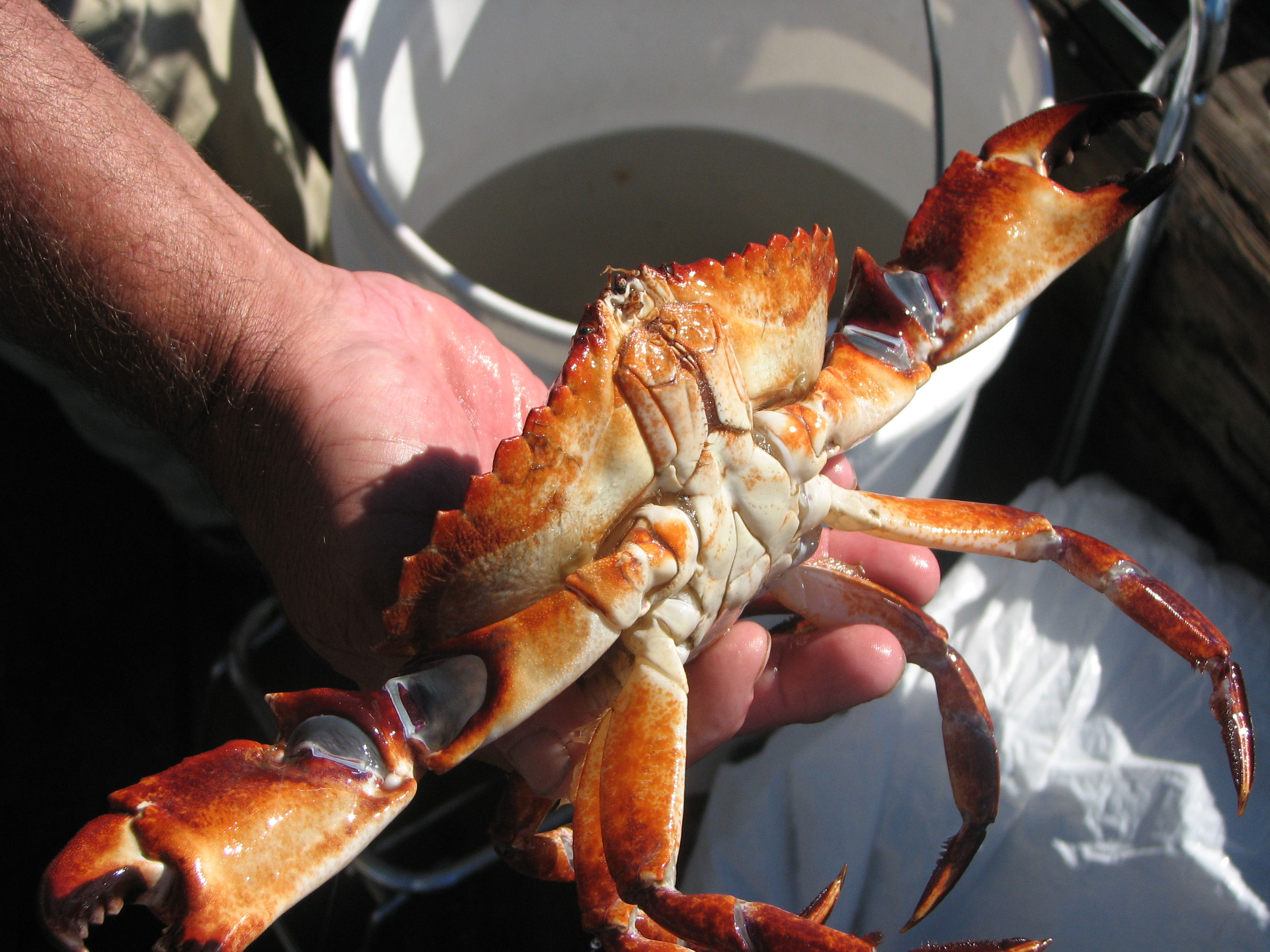
Closeup of a red rock crab

Cancer productus ranges from Kodiak Island, Alaska, to Isla San Martine, Baja California. It inhabits mid-intertidal waters to 79 m depth.

== Biology ==
Cancer productus is carnivorous; in Puget Sound it will crush barnacles with its large pincers for consumption. Small living crabs and dead fish are also eaten. Mating in this species occurs when the female is soft-shelled from October to June in Puget Sound. The male can often been seen guarding females until molting during this time. This species is known to be a favorite prey item of the giant Pacific octopus, Enteroctopus dofleini.

== Fishery ==
Cancer productus is harvested by sport and commercial fishermen in California, mostly from Morro Bay south. The California rock crab fishery is made up of three species – the yellow rock crab (C. anthonyi), the brown rock crab (R. antennarium), and the red rock crab (C. productus). Rock crab landings for 1999 were 790,000 pounds and have averaged 1.2 million pounds per year from 1991–1999.

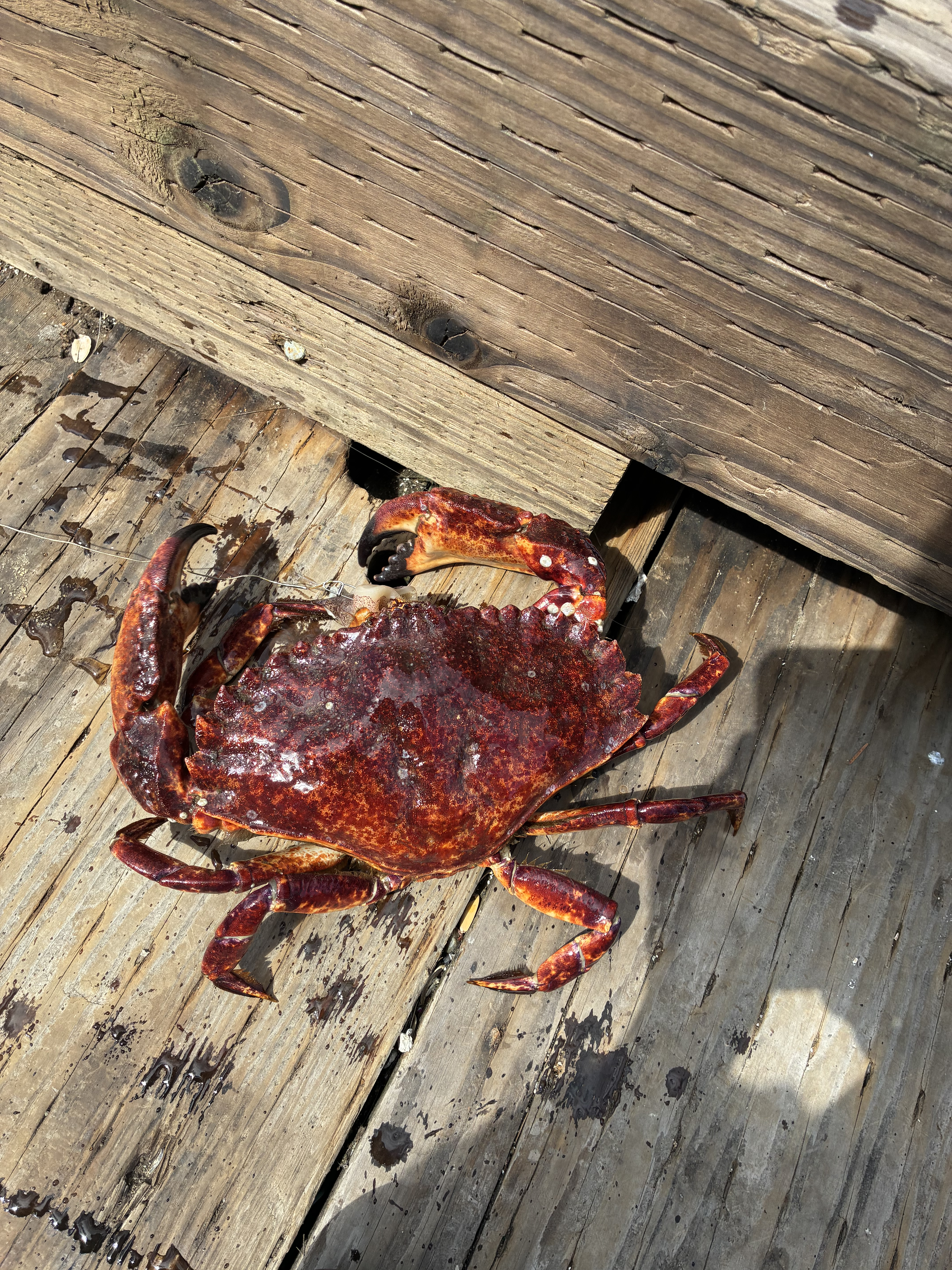
Red rock crab caught off of Puget Sound.

It is not as sought after as Dungeness crab due to the considerably lower amount of flesh. However, the flesh has a delicate flavor and slightly sweet taste. The similar Cancer pagurus has a major commercial fishery in western Europe. Both males and females with a carapace exceeding 5 inches (130 mm) may be harvested in Washington state, when in season.
