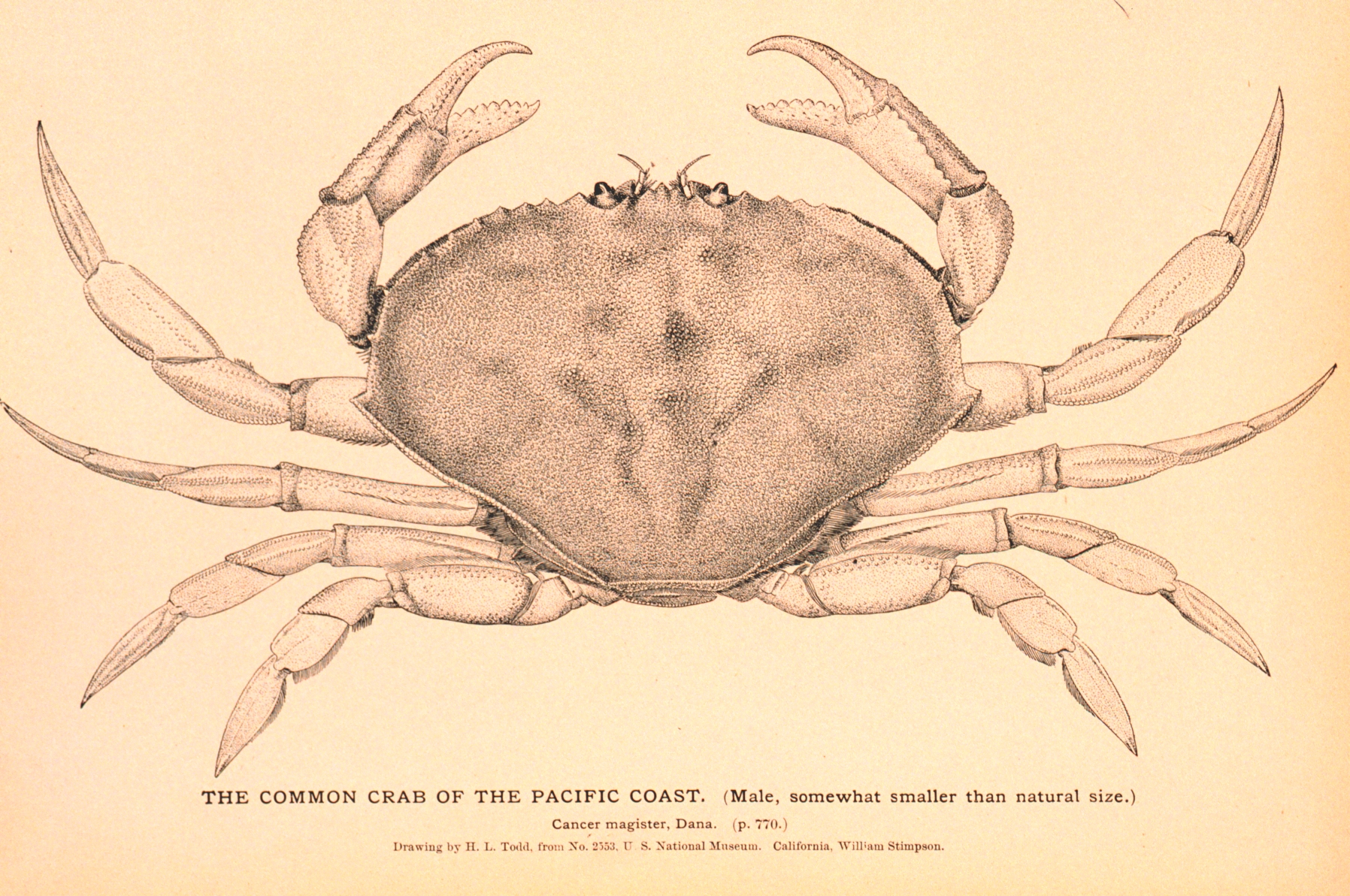

Scientific classification
- Kingdom: Animalia
- Phylum: Arthropoda
- Clade: Pancrustacea
- Class: Malacostraca
- Order: Decapoda
- Suborder: Pleocyemata
- Infraorder: Brachyura
- Family: Cancridae
- Genus: Metacarcinus; A. Milne-Edwards, 1862

Type species
- Metacarcinus magister Dana, 1852

= Metacarcinus =

Metacarcinus Temporal range: Oligocene–Recent

Genus of crabs

Metacarcinus is a genus of crabs formerly included in the genus Cancer. It includes nine exclusively fossil species and five extant species, of which four are also known from the fossil record. A molecular study using the cytochrome oxidase I gene does not support the monophyly of this genus.

== Description ==
Metacarcinus crabs have an oval carapace of about two-thirds of its largest width, with a surface with poorly marked division of smooth or gently colored regions. The front edge usually does not protrude before the orbital, and the total length of these edges is 26–34% of the largest width of the carapace, with five spikes, including inner orbits, of which the middle springs lower than the others. 9–10 spikes are located on both anteroposterior lateral sides of the carapace; they can be of different shapes. The lateral edges are edged and can have one spike. The claws propodite is characterized by an upper edge at an angle of about 120° to the distal edge, equipped with sharp spines or grained or smooth keel. On the external surface of the propodite there are usually four balls. The cutting edges of the pliers' fingers of the claw have sharp teeth. The fixed finger has two points: middle and on the bottom edge.

== Extant species ==
Included species:

Image	Scientific name	Common name	Distribution
	Metacarcinus anthonyi	yellow rock crab or yellow crab	Pacific coast of North America
	Metacarcinus edwardsii	mola rock crab, southern rock crab, or Chilean rock crab	Pacific coast between Guayaquil in Ecuador and the Beagle Channel in the southernmost Chile
	Metacarcinus gracilis	graceful rock crab or slender crab	from Alaska to Bahía Magdelena, Baja California
	Metacarcinus magister	Dungeness crab	west coast of North America
	Metacarcinus novaezelandiae	Pie crust crab	New Zealand and south-eastern Australia.

== Fossils ==
- † Metacarcinus danai (Miocene, California)
- † Metacarcinus davidi (Miocene to Pliocene, California)
- † Metacarcinus goederti (Oligocene, Alaska)
- † Metacarcinus izumoensis (Miocene, Japan)
- † Metacarcinus jenniferae (Middle Pliocene, California)
- † Metacarcinus minutoserratus (Pliocene, Japan)
- † Metacarcinus starri (Early Oligocene, Washington)
