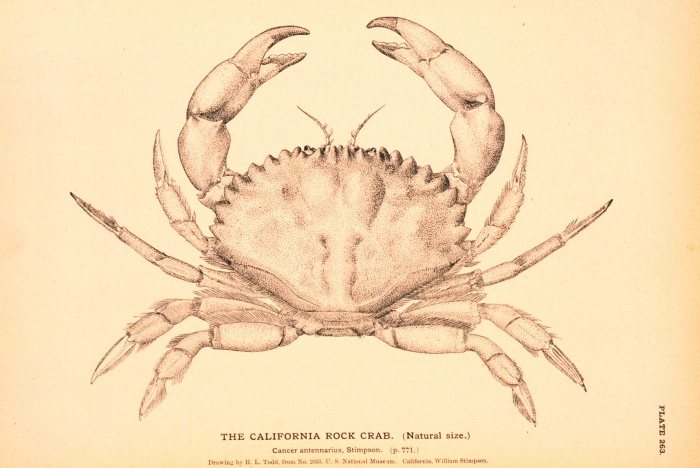

Scientific classification
- Domain: Eukaryota
- Kingdom: Animalia
- Phylum: Arthropoda
- Class: Malacostraca
- Order: Decapoda
- Suborder: Pleocyemata
- Infraorder: Brachyura
- Family: Cancridae
- Genus: Romaleon
- Species: R. antennarium

Binomial name
- Romaleon antennarium (Stimpson, 1856)

Synonyms
- Cancer antennarius Stimpson, 1856

= Romaleon antennarium =

Species of crab

Romaleon antennarium (formerly Cancer antennarius), commonly known as the Pacific, brown or California rock crab, is a crab of the genus Romaleon found on the western coast of North America.

== Description ==
Romaleon antennarium has a fan-shaped carapace with eleven teeth to either side of the eyestalks, the widest point falling at the eighth or ninth tooth. The chelipeds are quite stout with the black tips bent downward. The antennae are long and prominent, accounting for the specific name. The dorsal surfaces of adults are uniformly red, but the ventral surface of the carapace is spotted.

This species is easily confused with the red rock crab, Cancer productus. They can be distinguished by the less prominent antennae, less robust claws, and lack of ventral spots on the latter.

== Fishery ==
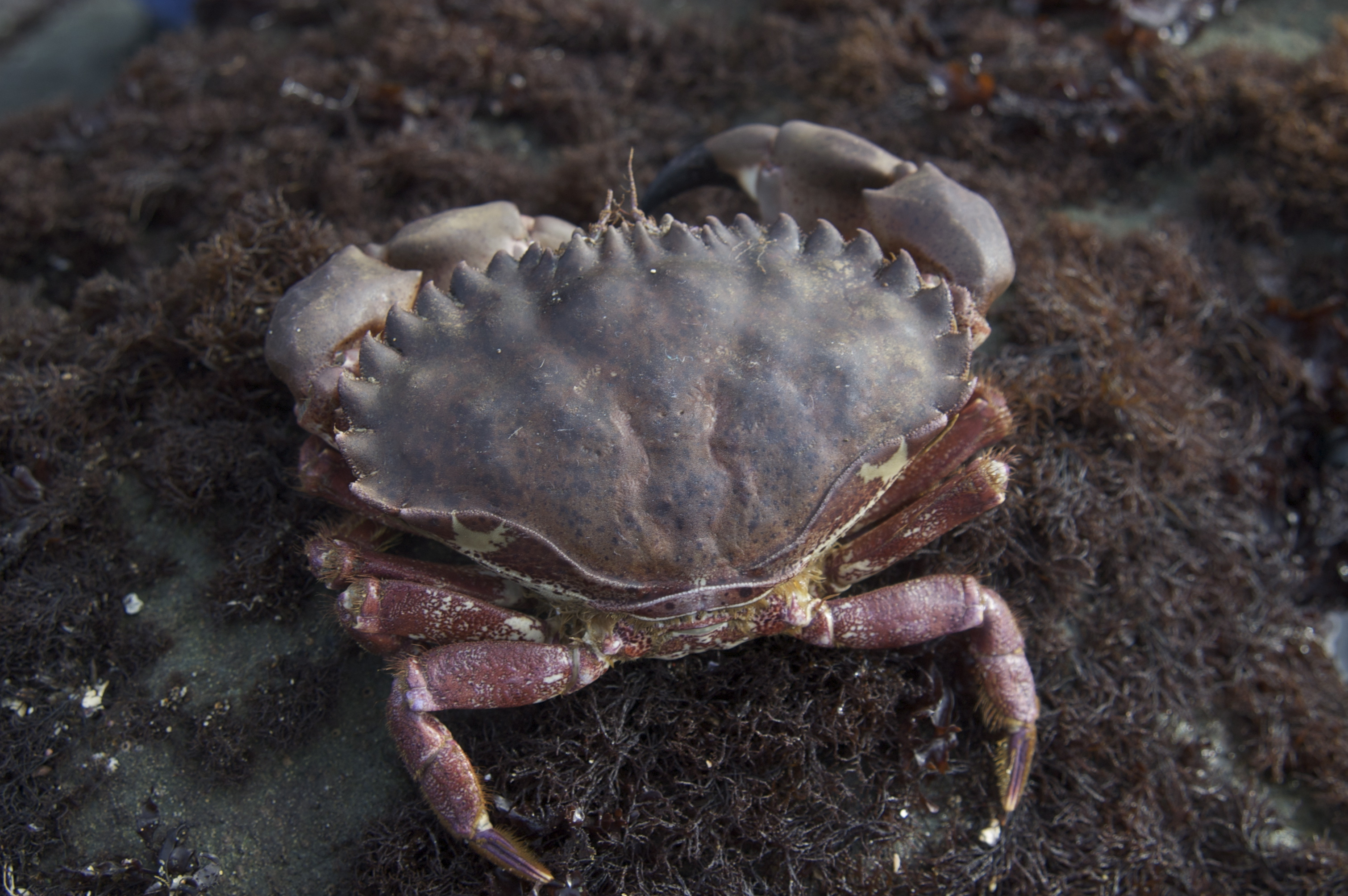

Romaleon antennarium is harvested by sport and commercial fishermen in California, mostly from Morro Bay south. The California rock crab fishery is made up of three species - the yellow rock crab (C. anthonyi), the brown rock crab (R. antennarium), and the red rock crab (C. productus). Rock crab landings for 1999 were 790,000 pounds and have averaged 1.2 million pounds per year from 1991-1999.
