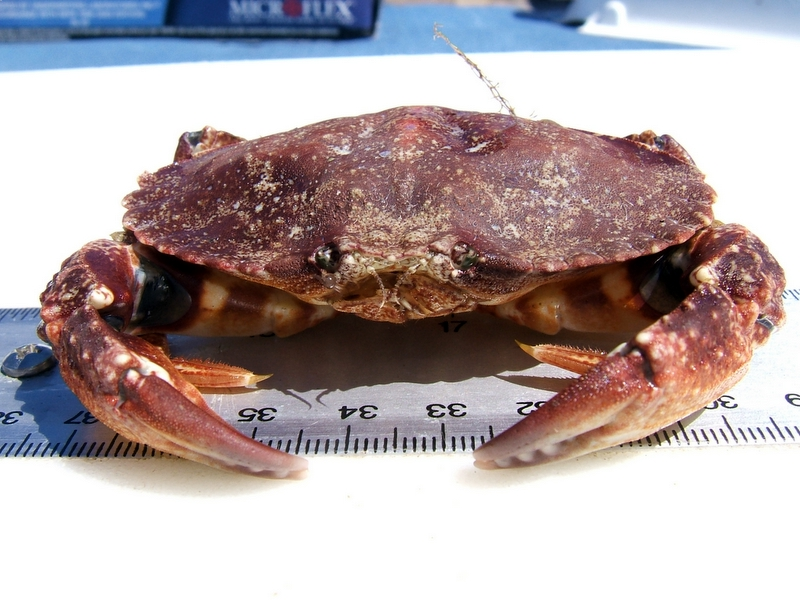

Scientific classification
- Kingdom: Animalia
- Phylum: Arthropoda
- Class: Malacostraca
- Order: Decapoda
- Suborder: Pleocyemata
- Infraorder: Brachyura
- Family: Cancridae
- Genus: Metacarcinus
- Species: M. gracilis

Binomial name
- Metacarcinus gracilis (Dana, 1852)

Synonyms
- Cancer gracilis Dana, 1852

= Metacarcinus gracilis =

Species of crab

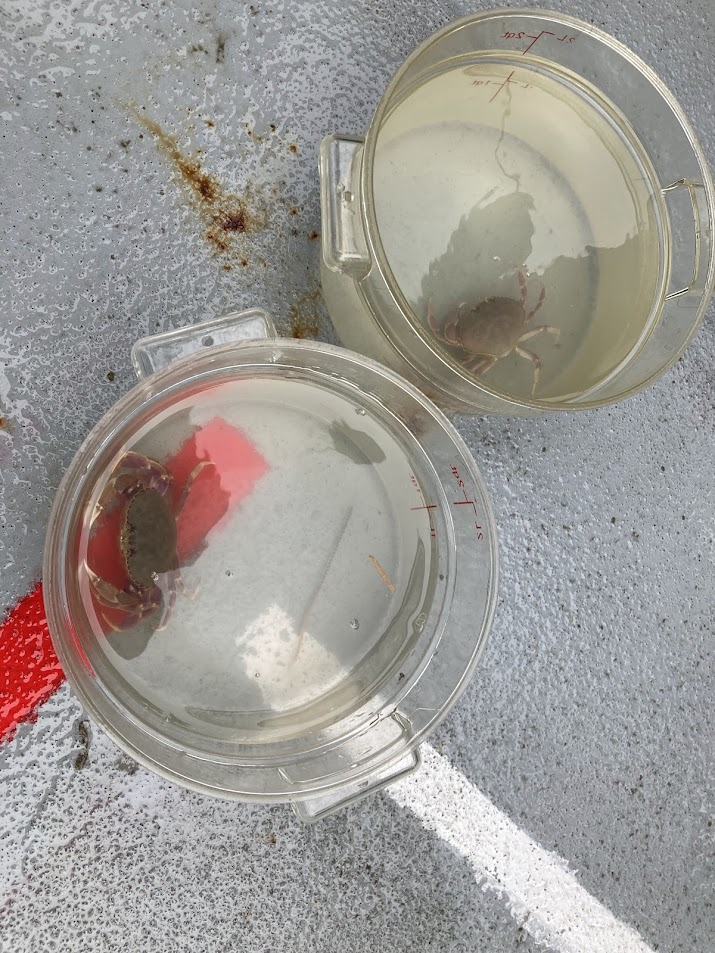
2 small slender crabs in viewing tanks

The graceful rock crab or slender crab, Metacarcinus gracilis (the naming convention recognized by WoRMS) or Cancer gracilis (the naming convention recognized by ITIS), is one of two members of the genus Metacarcinus, with white tipped chelae (claws). The second crab in the genus to have white tipped claws is M. magister (Dungeness crab). Both of these eastern Pacific crab species are recognized by ITIS as belonging to the much larger genus Cancer. M. gracilis has been caught from Alaska to Bahía Magdalena, Baja California Sur. Although M. gracilis is only found in the Pacific Ocean, it has cousins in the Atlantic Ocean. The genus Cancer (sensu lato) apparently evolved in the Pacific Ocean and later migrated to the Atlantic Ocean. Larvae and small juveniles of this species are often seen riding jellyfish, especially Phacellophora camtschatica. The juvenile crabs steal food from the jellyfish and also clean off parasitic amphipods.

== Morphology ==
Like the other members of the family Cancridae, the slender crab has a very broad and oval carapace with dull, tooth-like protrusions toward the front of the carapace. Female crabs can be distinguished from males by a broad tail flap on their undersides, which are used for protecting their eggs when they are gravid. The slender crab carapace is usually olive brown, and its legs vary from yellowish brown to purple. M. gracilis only grows to a width of about 3.5 inches (9 cm) and resembles a juvenile M. magister (dungeness crab). Often the two species can be confused, as M. gracilis looks very similar to a juvenile Dungeness crab. They can readily be distinguished from each other, though M. gracilis has a notch behind the widest point of its carapace that M. magister lacks, and the top joint of its pincers are not serrated like those of M. magister. More obscure ways to tell are by the appearance of hair on the posterior three legs of M. magister where M. gracilis is almost always hairless. Another telling characteristic of the slender crab is that the last segment of its tail flap is pointed, where M. magister is curved.
