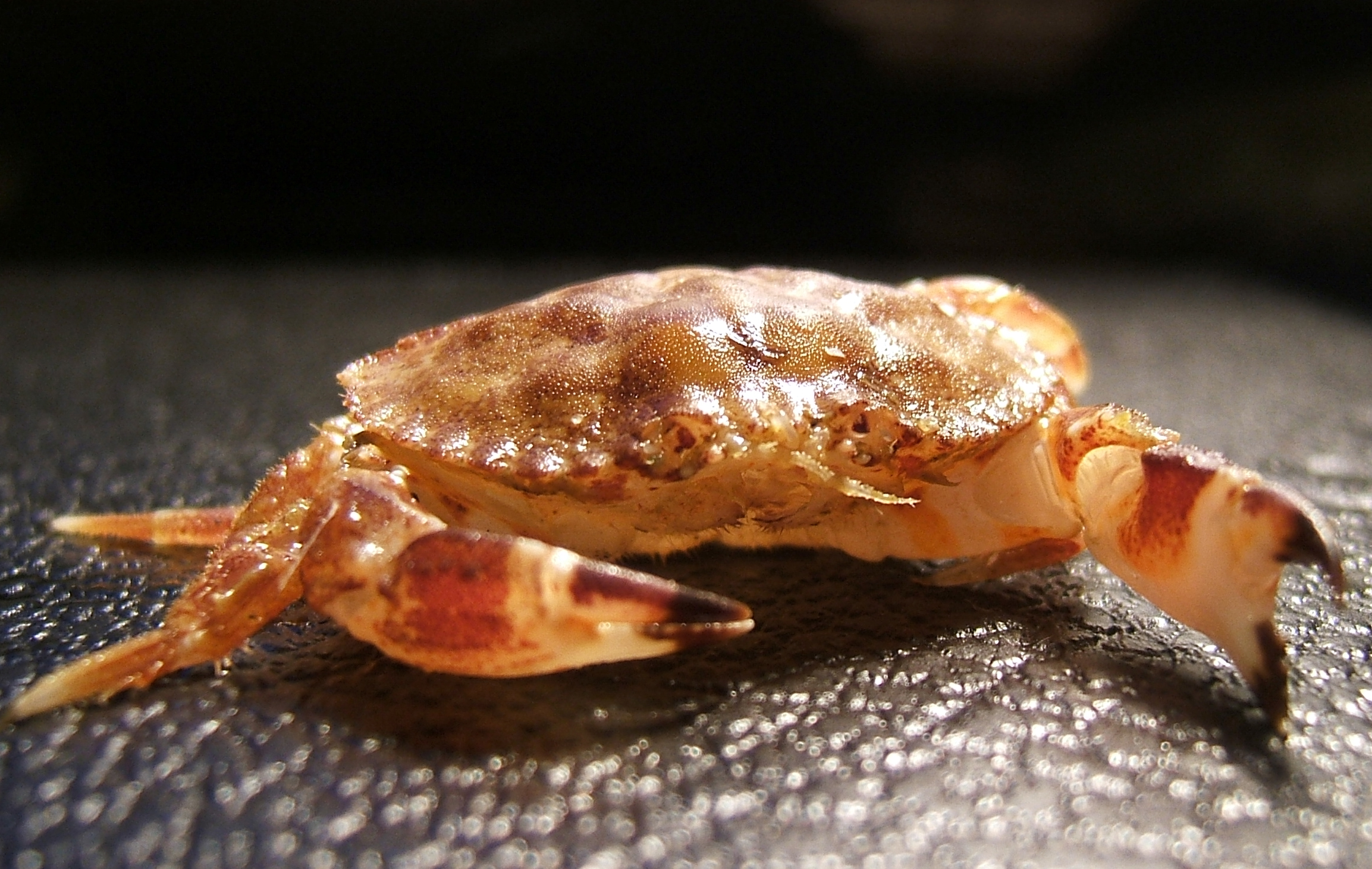
- Exuvia of Metacarcinus anthonyi
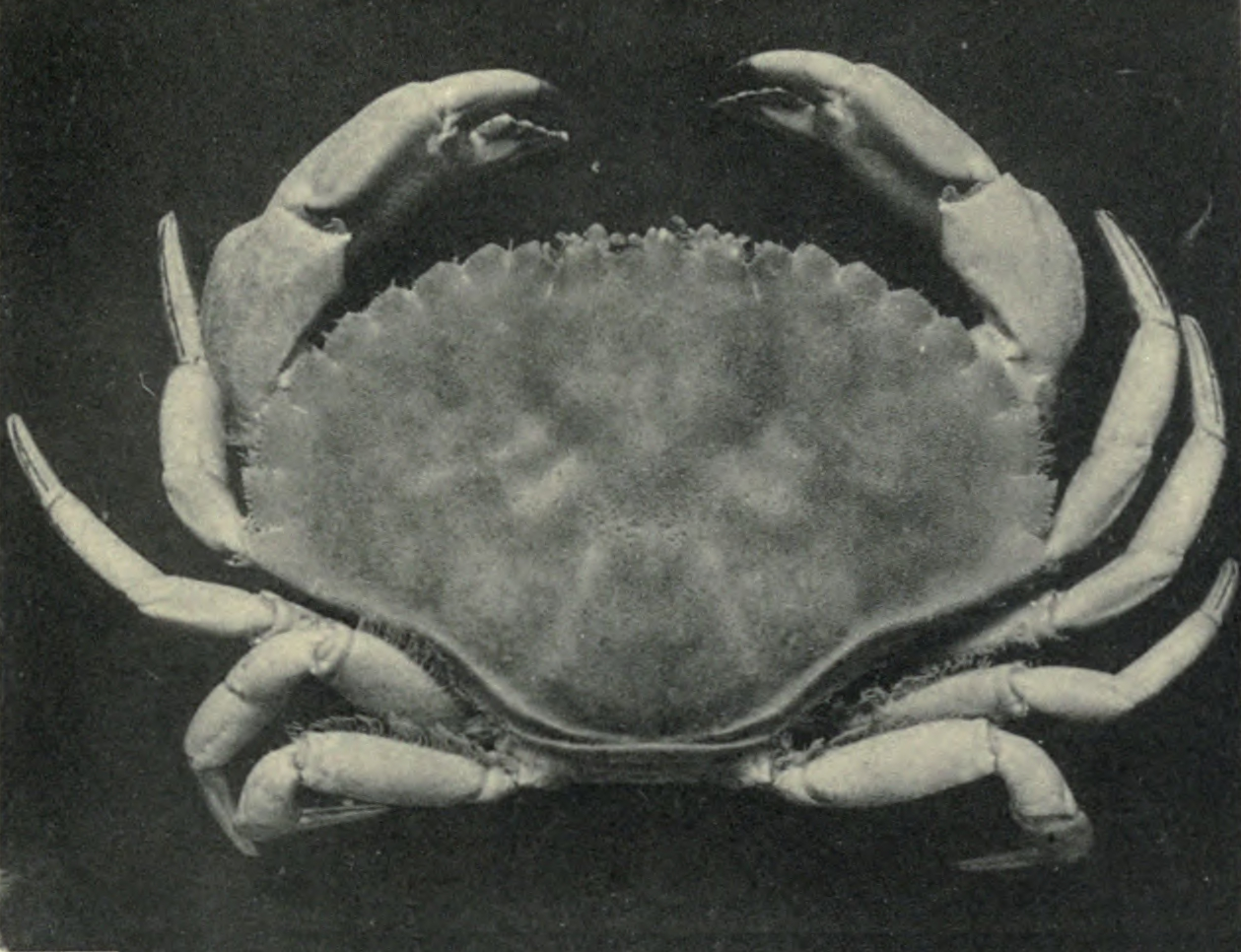
- Metacarcinus anthonyi male

Scientific classification
- Domain: Eukaryota
- Kingdom: Animalia
- Phylum: Arthropoda
- Class: Malacostraca
- Order: Decapoda
- Suborder: Pleocyemata
- Infraorder: Brachyura
- Family: Cancridae
- Genus: Metacarcinus
- Species: M. anthonyi

Binomial name
- Metacarcinus anthonyi (Rathbun, 1897)
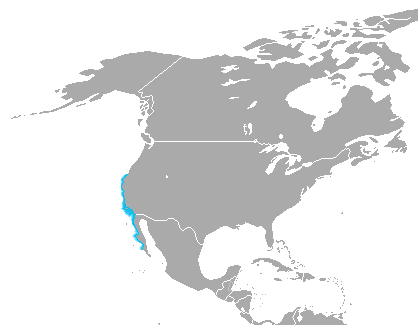
- Metacarcinus anthonyi range

Synonyms
- Cancer anthonyi Rathbun, 1897

= Metacarcinus anthonyi =

Metacarcinus anthonyi Temporal range: Pliocene–Recent

Species of crustacean

Metacarcinus anthonyi, the yellow rock crab or yellow crab, is a species of edible crab native to the Pacific coast of North America.

== Distribution ==
Metacarcinus anthonyi occurs from Magdalena Bay, Baja California north to Humboldt Bay in Northern California, although it is uncommon further north than San Pedro. It lives in rocky areas at depths of up to 132 m (433 ft). Only the juveniles live in the intertidal zone.

Some fossils of M. anthonyi are also known from central and southern California, dating from the Pliocene and Pleistocene.

== Description ==
Male yellow rock crabs can reach 165 mm carapace width, while females reach 148 mm. The carapace is oval, fairly broad, and widest at the 9th of 10 forward-curving anterolateral teeth. Like other California Cancridae crabs, M. anthonyi has black-tipped claws. M. anthonyi can be distinguished from Romaleon antennarium by its lack of red spotting on its underside. M. anthonyi also tends not to decorate itself and tends not to have hairy legs. It can vary in coloration from yellow to brown with the juvenile crabs tending to be darker than adults.

Metacarcinus anthonyi is one of only two species that regularly reach the minimum landing size for crabs in Southern California – the other being Cancer productus – and is the subject of commercial fisheries. R. antennarium is also caught throughout Southern California commercially

== Ecology and life cycle ==
Metacarcinus anthonyi is an ecologically important species. It is prey for many fish including the scorpion fish, barred sand bass and other rock fishes. M. anthonyi is also prey for sea otters, a threatened species. M. anthonyi is both a scavenger and a predator eating anything that the large claws can crush including echinoderms, snails and clams.

Metacarcinus anthonyi reaches sexual maturity after 10–12 molts. Mating typically takes place in June, and occurs shortly after the females have molted. Before molting, females release a pheromone which induces courtship behavior in the males.

== Taxonomy ==
Metacarcinus anthonyi was first described by Mary J. Rathbun in 1897, under the name Cancer anthonyi. The specific epithet commemorates Alfred Webster Anthony, a naturalist working in San Diego.

== Fishery ==
Metacarcinus anthonyi is harvested by sport and commercial fishermen in California, mostly from Morro Bay south. The California rock crab fishery is made up of three species - the yellow rock crab (C. anthonyi), the brown rock crab (C. antennarius), and the red rock crab (C. productus). Rock crab landings for 1999 were 790,000 pounds and have averaged 1.2 million pounds per year from 1991-1999.
