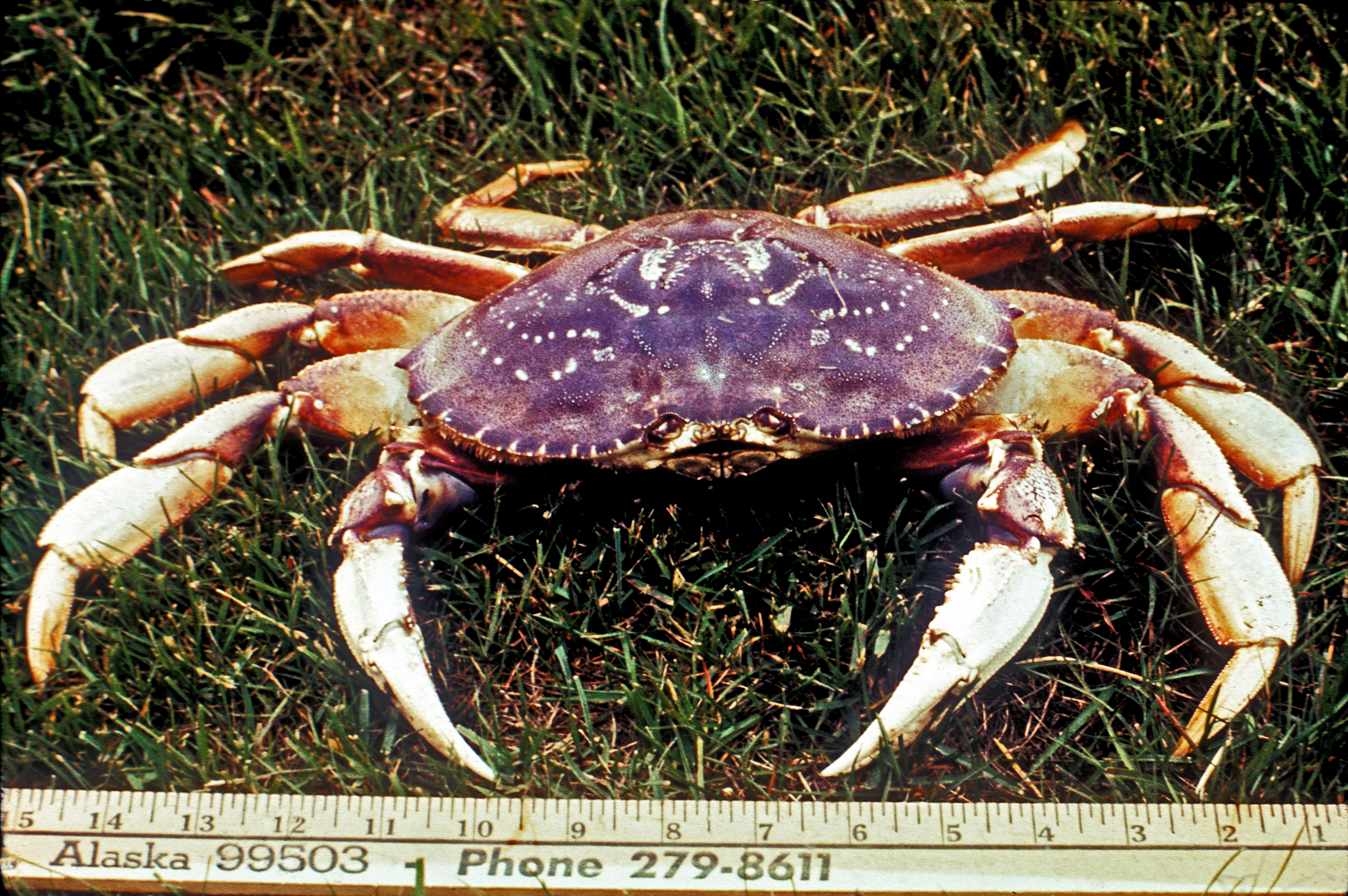
- Dungeness crab measuring 17 cm (6.7 in)

Conservation status
- Secure (NatureServe)

Scientific classification
- Kingdom: Animalia
- Phylum: Arthropoda
- Clade: Pancrustacea
- Class: Malacostraca
- Order: Decapoda
- Suborder: Pleocyemata
- Infraorder: Brachyura
- Family: Cancridae
- Genus: Metacarcinus
- Species: M. magister

Binomial name
- Metacarcinus magister (Dana, 1852)

Synonyms
- Cancer magister Dana, 1852

= Dungeness crab =

Species of crustacean

The Dungeness crab (Metacarcinus magister) is a species of crab in the family Cancridae. It makes up one of the most important seafood industries along the west coast of North America. Its typical range extends from Alaska's Aleutian Islands to Point Conception, near Santa Barbara, California. Dungeness typically grow 6–7 in (150–180 mm) at their widest point and inhabit eelgrass beds and sandy bottoms. Its common name comes from the Dungeness Spit in the Strait of Juan de Fuca, Washington state, United States, which shelters a shallow bay inhabited by the crabs.

== Description ==
Dungeness crabs have four pairs of armored legs, two claws, and a wide, hard shell. A Dungeness's legs are shorter compared to other commercial crabs and their claws have a distinctive hook. The claws of the crab are used both as defense and to tear apart large food items. The crab uses its smaller appendages to pass the food particles into its mouth. Once inside the crab's stomach, food is further digested by the "gastric mill", a collection of tooth-like structures.

Crabs must periodically molt to grow; this process is called ecdysis. Molting has the ability to regenerate lost limbs, although they will be smaller the first molt after loss. During a molt, the shell will separate where the carapace and abdomen meet. This allows the crab to exit the old shell. Once outside the old shell the soft new shell will fill with water and the crab will become 15-25% bigger than its original size. During the first few weeks after molting, the crab is very vulnerable due to the softness of its shell; the shell will not fully harden for two months after molting. For the first two years of a crab's life, it will molt six times a year. In the third year, males molt twice and females molt once. After that, all crabs will molt once a year, with females molting in the spring and males molting in the summer. Dungeness typically live five years and measure 6–7 in (150–180 mm) at the end of their life. However, the crabs can live up to eight years on the west coast of the US and have been seen to reach 13 years in the northern reaches of their range. At these ages, maximum female size can be up to 7 in (180 mm) and maximum male size up to 9 in (230 mm).

M. magister prefers to eat clams, other crustaceans, and small fish, but is also an effective scavenger. Their scavenging habits can even lead them to eat other Dungeness.

A genetic analysis of adult Dungeness crabs indicated that there is one population across the California Current System, but it is likely that interannual variation in physical oceanographic conditions (such as ocean circulation patterns) influence larval recruitment among regions, causing genetic diversity to change through time.

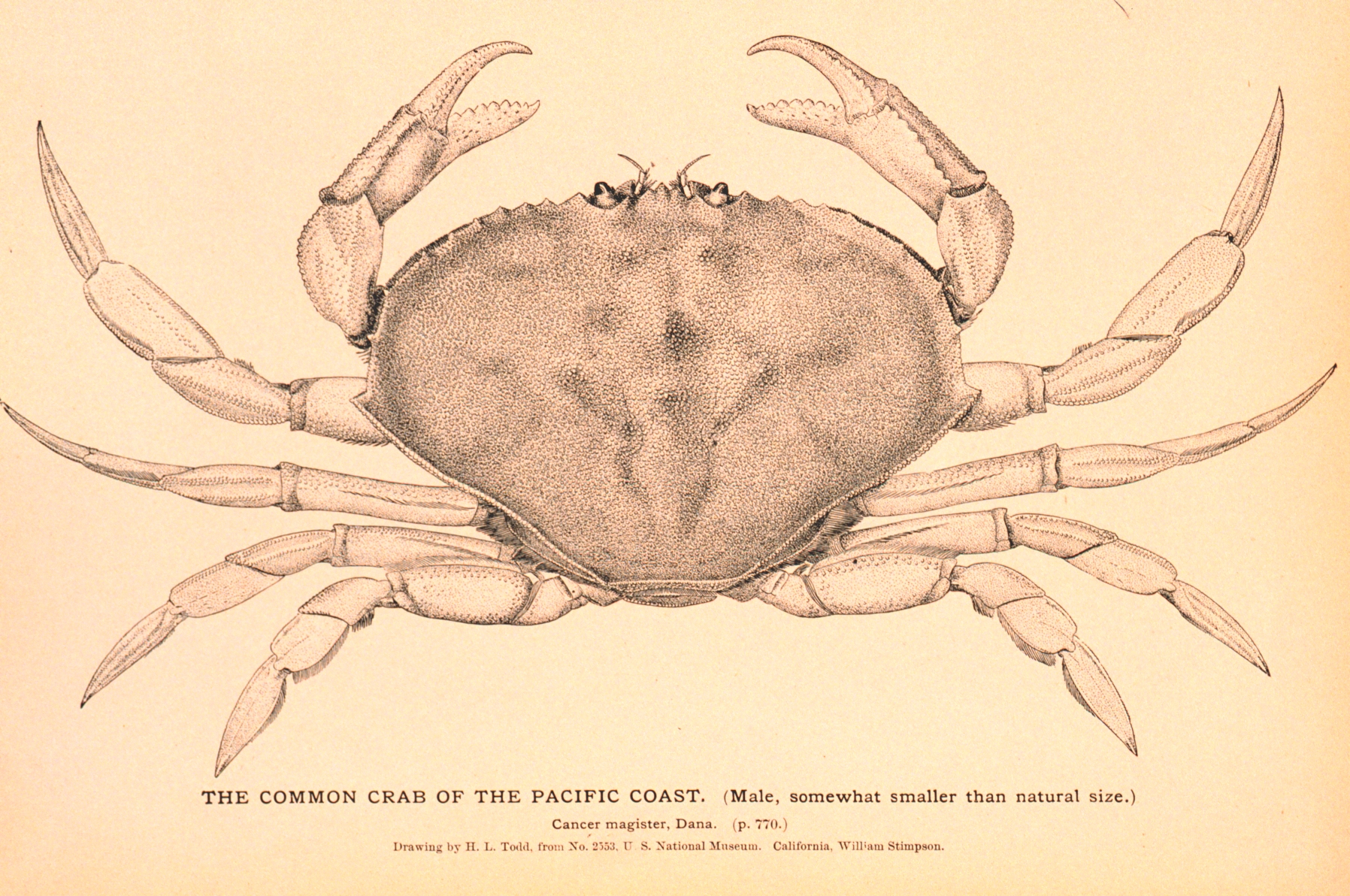
The Common Crab of the Pacific Coast. (Male.) Cancer magister, James Dwight Dana. From The Fisheries and Fisheries Industries of the United States

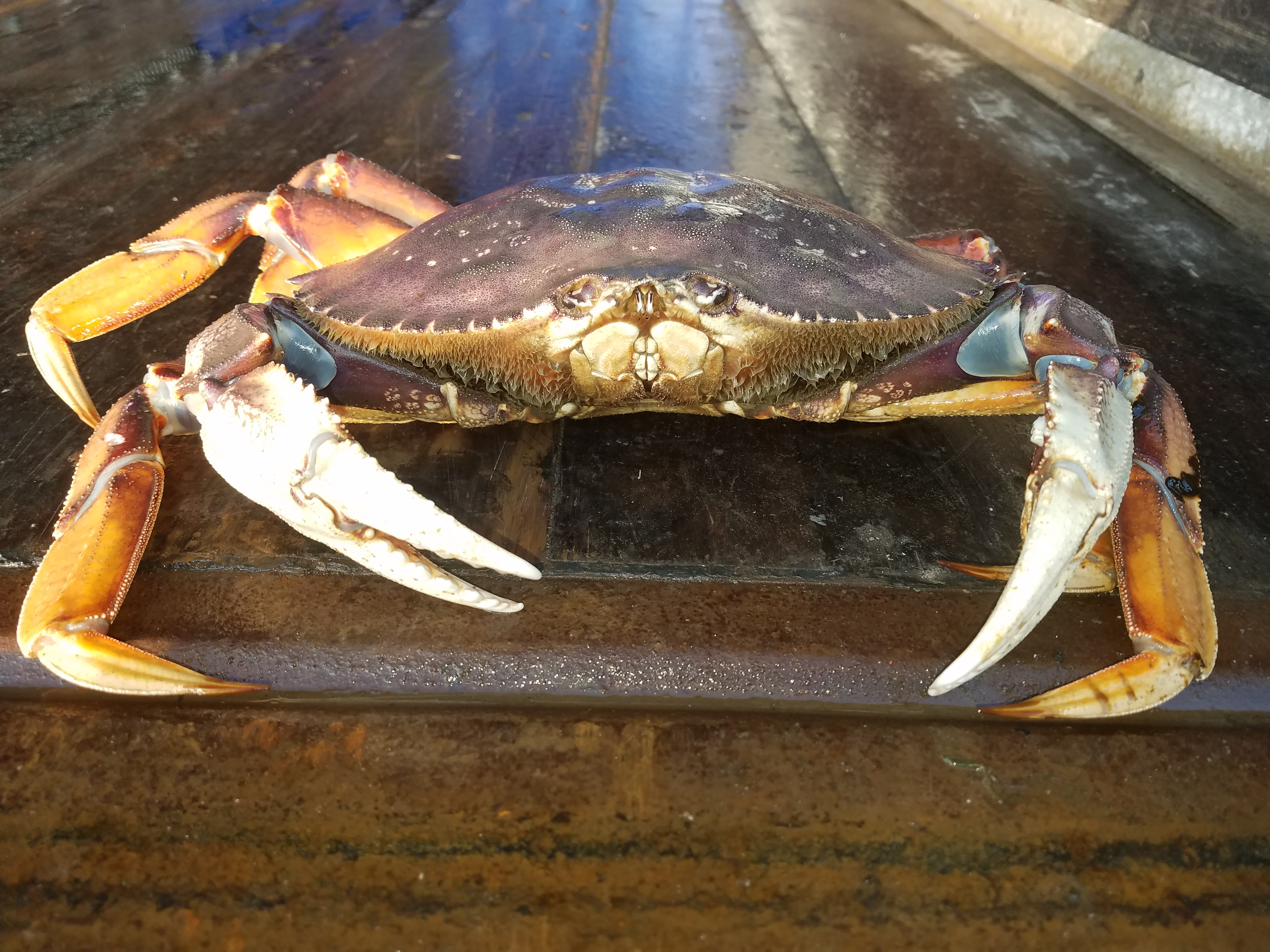
A large Dungeness crab

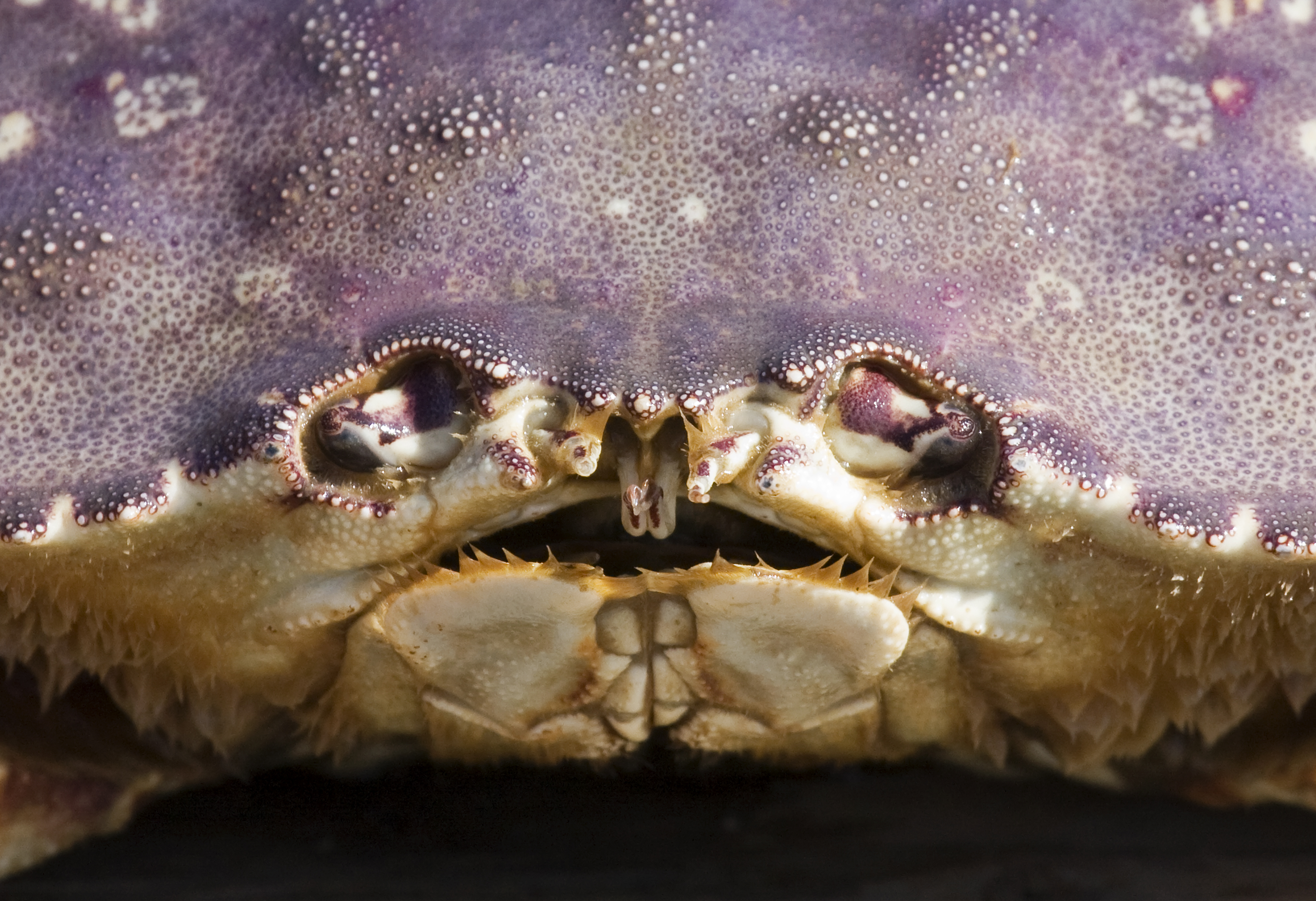
Close-up of the head: the two eyes sit on eyestalks, with an antennule on either side of the rostrum (center, above the mouth)

== Life cycle ==
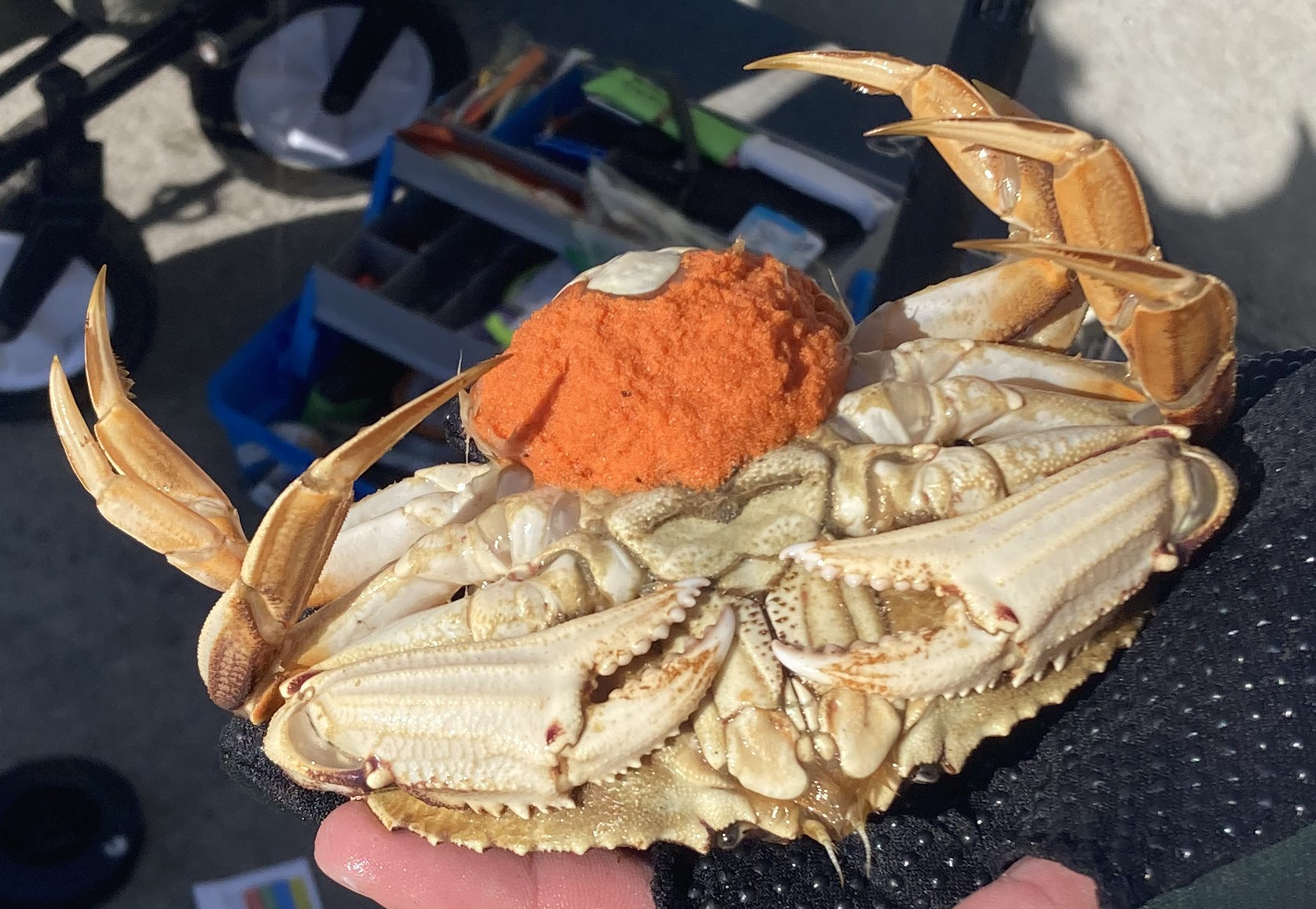
A caught female Dungeness crab brooding eggs during spawning season, Nov 2024

Mature female crabs generally molt in late spring, although exact timing varies with location. Mating occurs immediately after the female has molted and before the new exoskeleton hardens. Males are able to detect when females are molting, presumably through pheromones although this is not confirmed yet. Each mating season, male crabs may mate with many partners. Upon locating an available female, the male initiates a protective premating embrace that lasts for several days. In this embrace, the female is tucked underneath the male, oriented such that their abdomens touch and their heads face each other. The sperm deposited by the male is stored in the spermatheca and all sperm can be stored for up to two and a half years. This means a female may choose to use older sperm or not to mate at all during a given year. Fertilization occurs from October to December when eggs are deposited into the adnominal flap of the female. The females extrude the fertilized eggs and hold them in specialized hair located on their tail flap. Dungeness eggs are at first bright orange and darken as they develop. A single female can hold up to 2 million eggs depending on her size; females that use older sperm will carry fewer eggs. In the winter, a female crab will bury herself in the sand and become inactive in order to protect her eggs. Eggs typically hatch in the spring, although exact time varies with location.

Young crabs are free-swimming after hatching and are diel vertical migrators that can be found at depths up to 80 ft (24 m) during the day. The crabs go through five zoeal larval stages and one megalops stage before settling to the bottom in their first juvenile stage. The free-swimming stages typically take three months to four months, although in Alaska crabs may remain larvae for up to a year. Sexual maturity is reached after about 12 molts or two years. The crab's typical lifespan is 8-13 years.

== Habitat and range ==
Dungeness are most often found in areas with sandy bottoms but can be found on a wide variety of bottom types. The crabs are found in high density from the intertidal zone to a depth of between 170 and 300 ft (52 and 91 m). Individual Dungeness have been found as deep as 2,624 ft (800 m). Adult Dungeness require water with surface temperatures ranging from 38–65 °F (3–18 °C) and salinity ranging from 11 to 35 practical salinity units (PSU). Larvae are much more sensitive to such environmental conditions as salinity and require temperatures of between 50 and 57 °F (10 and 14 °C).

The typical range of the Dungeness extends from Alaska's Aleutian Islands to Point Conception, near Santa Barbara, California. Occasionally, the crab can be found as far south as Magdalena Bay, Baja California Sur, Mexico.

== Fishery ==
The Dungeness fishery was started by San Francisco fishermen in 1848. By the early 1900s the fishery had expanded to match the entire range of the crabs. Around this time regulations were put in place to allow only hard-shelled male crabs that were at least 6 in (150 mm) inches at their widest point. Similar regulations are still followed today.

In all areas where Dungeness are fished a license is required for harvest whether it is commercial or recreational. Commercially in Oregon and Washington, a logbook that is to be turned in at the end of the season is additionally required. Trip limits (how many crabs someone can take in one day) and pot limits (how many pots someone can have in the water at once) are set for both commercial and recreational crabbing in all areas. In Washington state, bi-weekly crab condition testing occurs and if the crabs are found to be too soft shelled, the limits will be reduced. The crabbing season is generally open from November or December to late August or early September. Crabbing is closed in the fall to protect soft-shelled crabs.

Some recreational fishermen use crab rings or hoops to harvest Dungeness. These hoops sit flat on the bottom and are pulled up periodically, trapping any crabs in the hoop at the moment. Most crabs, however, are caught in wire pots attached to a small buoy. Pots are baited in the center and have one way door flaps for the crabs to enter through. Crab pots in all regions are required to have biodegradable rot cord attaching the pot and the buoy in case they are lost. Pots in Alaska are additionally required to be made with biodegradable twine so that the pot will fall apart if lost. In pots of all regions, escape rings are required to allow the escape of undersized and female crabs. In California, Oregon, and Washington these are required to be 4.5 in (110 mm); in Alaska rings are required to be 4.38 in (111 mm); in Canada they are required to be 4.1 in (105 mm). Pots are typically set in waters 60–300 ft (18–91 m) deep.

The legal size of crabs is 6.25 in (159 mm) in California, Oregon, and Washington for commercial fisheries and 6.5 in (170 mm) in Alaska and Canada. In recreational fisheries, the minimum size in California and Oregon is 5.75 inches (146 mm), while Washington is 6 inches (150 mm). In Alaska, Washington, Oregon, and California (commercial) fisheries, only male crabs are allowed to be harvested. Crabs typically reach legal size at three to five years depending on location (Alaska has much slower growth).

The Dungeness fishery has been closed in the Cook Inlet, Alaska, since 1991; Yakutat, Alaska, and the Prince William Sound, Alaska since 2000;; and the southern region of the Puget Sound, Washington since 2018. In Alaska, these closures are due to population decreases likely caused by increased otter predation and environmental shifts. In Washington state, the closures are due to population decreases caused by unknown factors.

== Sustainability ==
It is estimated that every season since 1970 the fishery has taken 9-98% of the legal-sized male population with an average of 66% a year. The majority of this catch is caught in the first six weeks of the season. Despite this, the fishery has had a stable mean catch for over thirty years indicating populations are not overfished. This is likely due to the regulations put in place that allow crabs at least one year of sexual maturity before capture. Although 143 crabs are thrown back for every 100 kept, the trapping and subsequent throwing back of non-legal Dungeness does not seem to cause an overabundance of harm to the population. Soft-shelled crabs have been shown to have the highest mortality rates at just 9-25%.

Due to catch averages staying consistent, it is assumed populations are healthy, but in reality very little is known about Dungeness crab populations. In California, Alaska, and Washington, research is minimal and information about populations is assumed from catch records. In Canada, two out of seven crabbing areas are examined twice every year. The other areas are studied inconsistently and usually in relation to specific research questions. In Oregon, monitoring programs are in place for mating success, genetic structure, population structure, and discard mortality.

The effect of the fishery on other species is variable. The effects on benthic species and bycatch are relatively unknown, although the effects are assumed to be negligible for both. In Alaska and Canada there is no known effect on any other species. In Washington, Oregon, and California, humpback whales are known to be highly affected with a high of 19 humpbacks entangled in crabbing line in 2016. In California, leatherback turtles, orcas, and blue whales have also been known to be impacted. In recent years entanglements of all species have increased; this is attributed to increased reporting and changes in these species' migration due to changes in prey abundance as a result of climate change. Entanglements are lower than they could be due to the timing of the crabbing season: the first six weeks of the crabbing season (when most fishing occurs) happens before the migration of many species. The high seen in 2016 was likely due to a late opening of the season because of toxic algal blooms.

Ghost fishing from lost equipment is a problem in the industry, the scale of which is generally unknown. It is estimated that 10-20% of gear is lost each year with 7.5-32.5% of that ghost fishing. Ghost fishing can entangle marine mammals, cause crab death, and harm the ecosystem. Additionally, lost gear may ghost fish in places far from their original spots due to currents and tides; buoys from lost pots in Oregon were recovered four years later in the Hawaiian islands.

Overall, Seafood Watch has given the Dungeness crab a sustainable seafood rating of "Good Alternative" meaning they are okay to buy but be sure to be aware of potential concerns.

== Culinary use ==
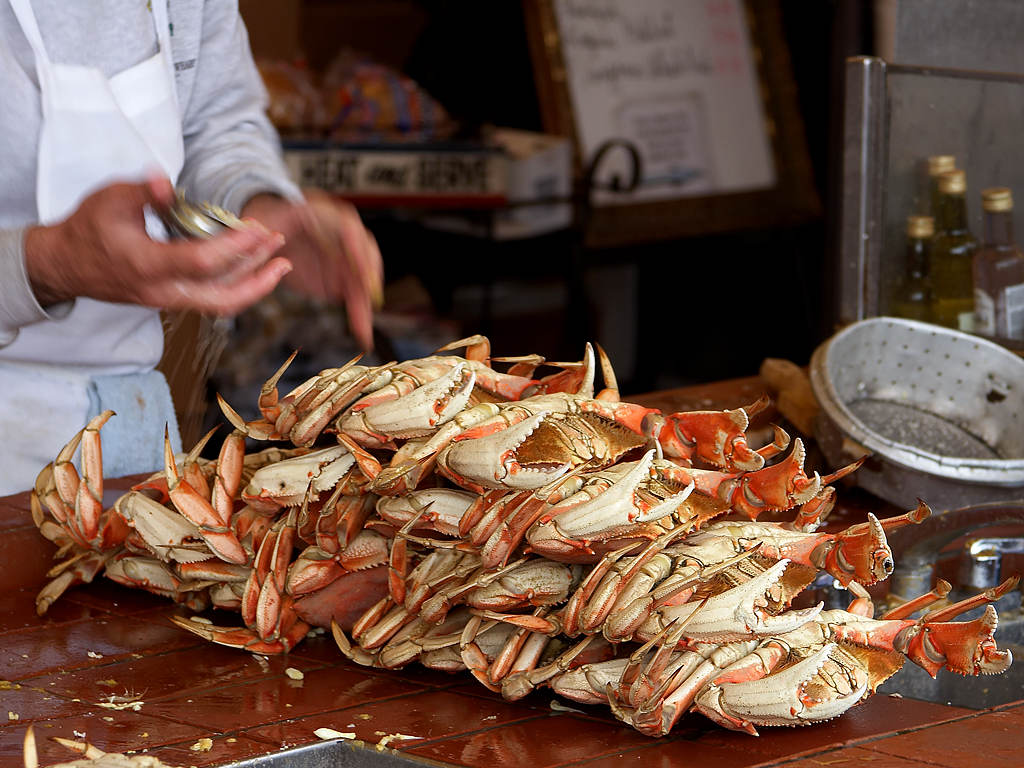
Dungeness crab ready to eat at Fisherman's Wharf, San Francisco

The Dungeness crab is considered a delicacy in the United States and Canada. Long before the area was settled by Europeans, Indigenous peoples throughout the crustacean's range had the crab as a traditional part of their diet and harvested them every year at low tide. The flesh has what is considered to be a delicate flavor and slightly sweet taste. Today they are an integral part of the cuisines of California, British Columbia, and the Pacific Northwest and traditionally feature in dishes like crab Louie or cioppino.

About one-quarter of the crab's weight is meat. Dungeness crabs can typically be purchased either live or cooked. A humane way to kill a live crab is to: 1) stun the crab by submerging it in ice water for several minutes, 2) flip the crab onto its back, and 3) drive the tip of a small pick about an inch below the center of its mouth. However, many cook live crabs by simply dropping them into boiling salt water. The crab then is allowed to cook for 15 minutes, after which time the crabs are removed and placed into cold water to cool and then cleaned. Cleaning the crab consists of removing the shell, scooping out the gills and intestines, and separating the legs and claws from the body. When removing the shell there will be a yellow substance, called crab fat or crab mustard (which is not fat, but actually the hepatopancreas) and is used in many dishes. Another method of preparing crab is called half-backing. Half-backing is done by flipping the crab upside down and chopping it in half (from head to "tail"), after which the guts and gills can be scooped or hosed out. Many consider half-backing to be superior to cooking the entire crab, because the meat is not contaminated by the flavor or toxins of the guts. Half-backed crabs boil faster or can be quickly steamed instead of boiled. Some common tools for removing crab meat from the shell are a crab cracker and a shrimp fork.

== Threats ==
In some areas adult Dungeness crabs can be found in or near estuaries. The hyposaline conditions of the estuaries are lethal to some of the crab's symbionts, such as Carcinonemertes errans which consumes a brooding female's live eggs. Dungeness crabs surveyed in Coos Bay were less likely to be infected by C. errans and have fewer worms present on their carapace when inhabiting less saline waters farther inland.

A 2020 study funded by NOAA showed that larval crabs are being affected by ocean acidification." Another potential harm related to global warming is red tides.

Another threat to the Dungeness crab is an invasive species called the European green crab (Carcinus maenas). The green crab outcompetes the Dungeness crab for food and habitat.

== Celebrations of the Dungeness crab ==
In 2009, after lobbying from school children at Sunset Primary School in West Linn, Oregon, and citing its importance to the Oregon economy, the Oregon Legislative Assembly designated the Dungeness crab as the state crustacean of Oregon. In 2024, California governor Gavin Newsom signed legislation designating the Dungeness crab as California's official state crustacean. The 2022-23 crab season brought revenue of about $54.4 million to the California economy.

The annual Dungeness Crab Festival is held in Port Angeles, Washington, each October.
